= Brazilian frigate Liberal =

Niterói-class Frigates

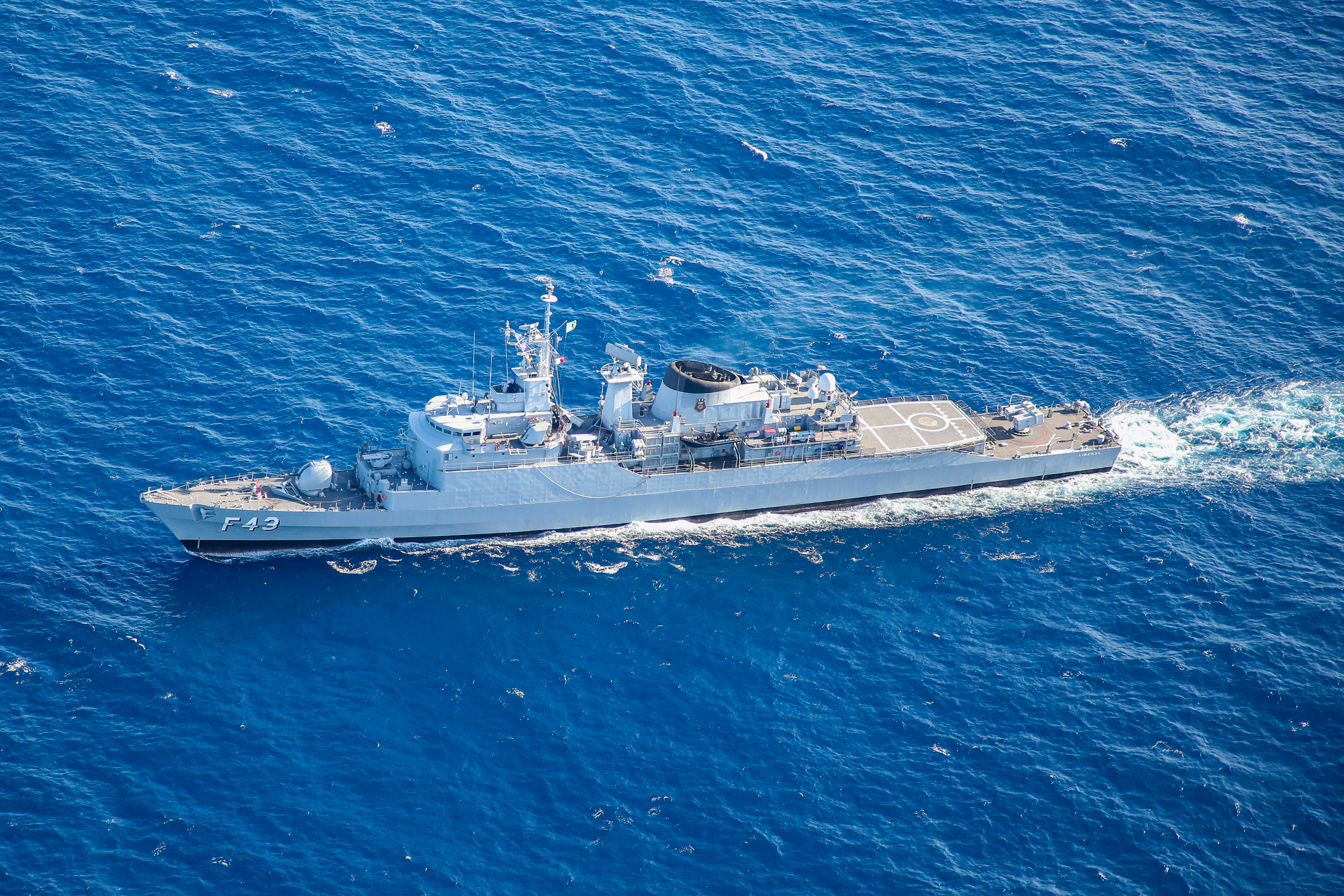
- Liberal

History

Brazil
- Name: Liberal
- Namesake: Liberal
- Builder: Vosper Thornycroft
- Launched: 7 February 1977
- Christened: 2 May 1975
- Commissioned: 18 November 1978
- Home port: Rio de Janeiro
- Identification: MMSI number: 710466000; Callsign: PWLI; Pennant number: F-43
- Motto: Nosso barco, nossa alma; (Our boat, our soul)
- Nickname(s): Lili
- Status: Active

General characteristics
- Class & type: Niterói-class frigate
- Displacement: 3.355 t (3.302 long tons)
- Length: 129.2 m (423 ft 11 in)
- Beam: 13.5 m (44 ft 3 in)
- Draught: 5.5 m (18 ft 1 in)
- Propulsion: CODOG, two shafts; 2 × Rolls-Royce Olympus TM-3B gas turbines 42,000 kW (56,000 hp) combined; 4 × MTU 16V 956 TB91 diesel engines 13,000 kW (17,000 hp) combined
- Speed: 30 knots (56 km/h; 35 mph) (maximum); 22 knots (41 km/h; 25 mph) (diesels only)
- Range: 5,300 nmi (9,800 km; 6,100 mi)
- Endurance: 45 days
- Complement: 217
- Sensors & processing systems: Modernized: Alenia RAN-20S air search radar; Terma Scanter surface search radar; Orion RTN-30X fire control radar; Saab EOS-400 optronic director; Krupp Atlas EDO-610E hull mounted sonar; SICONTA Mk 2 C3I system
- Electronic warfare & decoys: Modernized: Cutlass B1W ESM; ET/SQL-1 ECM; 12 × 102 mm decoy launchers
- Armament: Modernized: 1 × Albatros launcher for 8 Aspide surface-to-air missiles; 1 × 114 mm Mark 8 gun; 2 × Bofors 40 mm guns; 2 × twin launchers for Exocet anti-ship missiles; 2 × triple torpedo tubes for Mark 46 torpedoes; 1 × double-barrel Bofors Boroc anti-submarine rockets
- Aircraft carried: Westland Super Lynx Mk.21B helicopter
- Aviation facilities: Helipad and hangar

Liberal (F43) is a Niterói-class frigate of the Brazilian Navy. She was the fourth ship of her class ordered by the Brazilian Navy, on 20 September 1970. Liberal was launched on 7 February 1977, and was commissioned on 18 November 1978.

She is the fourth ship in the Brazilian Navy's history to bear the name Liberal, originally held by a corvette in the Brazilian Navy's first fleet.

== History ==
On 15 October 1998, the ship was docked to be submitted to the General Maintenance Period (PMG), and together with the Modernization Program (ModFrag).

From 15 May to 12 July, the ship was in the SWORDFISH / 2008 Commission, carrying out a presence action in the ports visited, strengthening ties of friendship between the navies of other countries and improving the degree of training of the ship in Operation Joint with the Armed Forces of Portugal and other participants. On 11 June 2008, she participated in commemorations related to the Naval Battle of Riachuelo in the port of Lisbon and made operational visits.

On 15 May 2012 she arrived at Lebanon to relieve União and take up duty as the flagship of UNIFIL's Maritime Task Force, patrolling the waters around Lebanon and training local forces in boarding and inspection operations. In 3 September, she performed PASSEX with the French frigate Jean de Vienne off the Lebanese coast. In October, she took part in light cargo transfer exercises with other MTF vessels, such as the Indonesian Navy's KRI Sultan Hasanuddin, and the German Navy's Magdeburg and Gepard. She would later take part in the live fire exercise Blue Hurricane with other MTF vessels and another light cargo transfer exercise with the Turkish frigate TCG Kemalreis.

Liberal would be relieved of her UNIFIL duties by Constituição on 13 January 2013. During her first voyage to Lebanon, she interrogated 661 vessels in the Lebanese exclusive economic zone, designated 266 merchant vessels for Lebanese inspection, and recorded over 20,000 nautical miles (37,000 km; 23,000 mi) of patrols in United Nations service. In her way back towards Rio de Janeiro, she performed PASSEX, Helo Cross Deck and Light-Line exercises with the French frigate Jean Bart off the coast of Beirut and docked at Civitavecchia from 21 to 24 January. In 25 January, she met the Royal Canadian Navy's HMCS Toronto to the south of Sardinia, where the two frigates performed PASSEX and leap frog exercises despite adverse sea conditions.

In 2014, Liberal had her second tenure as flagship of the UNIFIL MTF, arriving at Beirut on 11 January to relieve União and arrived back in Rio on 27 September.

On 7 September 2016, she arrived at Beirut for her third UNIFIL voyage, relieving Independência. On 28 September 2016, her Super Lynx helicopter performed the helivac of a crewman who had reported chest pains aboard the Maltese merchant vessel Silent, taking him to the Saint George hospital in Beirut. On 7 February 2017, Liberal reached the milestone of 2,700 days at sea during a patrol. She would be relieved by União, which arrived in the Mediterranean on 8 March 2017.

She reached the milestone of 3,000 total days at sea on 17 September 2019.

Liberal departed from Rio de Janeiro on 6 August 2023 for Operation Guinex III, which sought to develop interoperability between Brazilian and West African partner nations in maritime security operations, and having GRUMEC operators provide training in subjects such as boarding and inspection of unknown vessels, anti-piracy, transiting under asymmetrical threats, among others. The operation is expected to last until 14 October.

In August 2024, she took part in joint exercise Fraterno XXXVII in the South Atlantic along with the submarine Tikuna, as well as the Argentine Navy's destroyer Sarandí, offshore patrol vessel Almirante Storni and corvette Espora. The exercise's anti-submarine warfare element focused on reconnaissance, sonar tracking, search and attack by surface units, whereas the maritime element focused on joint air defense coordination, tactical formations and joint helicopter maneuvers. After Fraterno's conclusion, Sarandí and Liberal headed towards Valparaíso for UNITAS LXV. The two ships met and performed exercises with the Chilean frigate Almirante Lynch on the way.
