= ARA Bartolomé Cordero =

Bouchard-class offshore patrol vessel of the Argentinian Navy

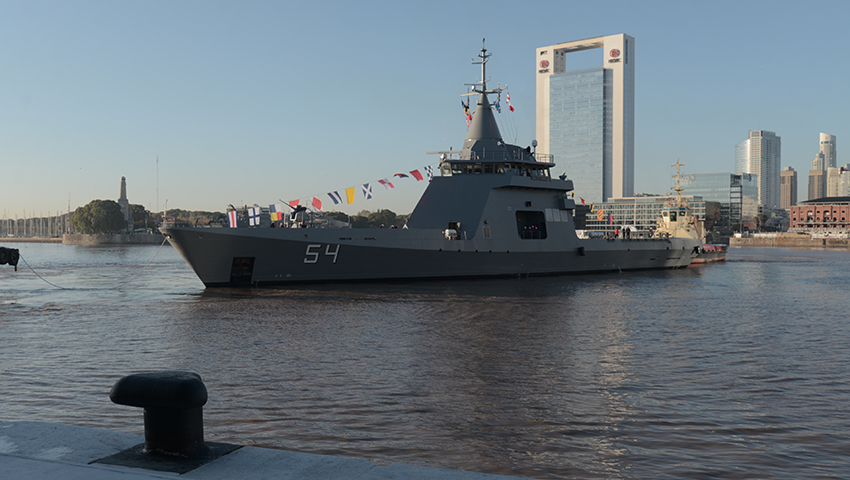
- ARA Contraalmirante Cordero (P-54)

History

Argentina
- Name: Contraalmirante Cordero
- Namesake: Bartolomé Leónidas Cordero
- Ordered: 2020
- Builder: DCNS, Lorient (now Kership)
- Launched: 21 September 2021
- Acquired: 11 April 2022
- Commissioned: 11 July 2022
- Identification: Pennant number: P-54
- Status: In active service

General characteristics
- Class & type: Kership offshore patrol vessel
- Displacement: 1,650 t (1,620 long tons) (full load)
- Length: 87 m (285 ft 5 in)
- Beam: 11 m (36 ft 1 in)
- Draft: 3.8 m (12 ft 6 in)
- Installed power: Electrical:
- Propulsion: 2 Anglo Belgian Corporation V16 diesel engines, 5.6 MW (7,500 hp)
- Speed: 21 knots (39 km/h; 24 mph)
- Range: 8,000 nmi (14,800 km; 9,200 mi) at 12 knots (22 km/h; 14 mph)
- Endurance: 30 days
- Boats & landing craft carried: 2 × 9 m (30 ft) RHIBs
- Complement: 30 core crew, up to 29 troops
- Sensors & processing systems: DCNS Polaris combat management system; Terma Scanter 6002 I-Band surface search radar; Terma Scanter 4102 I-Band air and surface search radar; Sagem EOMS (Electro Optical Multisensor System) NG; Sagem SIGMA 40D Inertial measurement unit; LinkSrechts Helicopter visual landing aid system
- Electronic warfare & decoys: Thales Altesse & Vigile LW ESM/COMINT system; Lacroix Defense & Security Sylena decoy system
- Armament: 1 × Leonardo 30 mm Marlin cannon; 2 × .50 cal. machine guns
- Aircraft carried: 1 × 5-ton helicopter or 1 × 10-ton helicopter (supported); RUAS-160 naval drone (one UAV to be acquired by the navy; service entry mid-2020s; further orders may follow)
- Aviation facilities: Helicopter pad and hangar

ARA Almirante Bartolomé Cordero (P-54) is the fourth and final Gowind-class offshore patrol vessel constructed for the Argentinian Navy.

The French shipbuilder Naval Group launched ARA Almirante Bartolomé Cordero on 21 September 2021 at Lanester. The ship was delivered to the Argentine Navy in April 2022. The ship sailed from France to Argentina in May/June 2022 and she was commissioned at the Mar del Plata Naval Base in July.

In November 2022, the ship carried out a relief and resupply mission to maritime traffic surveillance and control posts located on the islands of Tierra del Fuego and Isla de los Estados.

In 2023, the patrol vessel, accompanied by the destroyer Sarandí and supported by an S2T-Turbo Tracker aircraft, conducted joint exercises with the frigates Independência and União and the submarine Tikuna of the Brazilian Navy.

In early 2024 the patrol vessel accompanied the corvette Espora in carrying-out patrol missions to monitor Argentina's 200-nautical mile exclusive economic zone. In May, Almirante Bartolomé Cordero, in conjunction with her sister ships Piedrabuena and Almirante Storni, the destroyers La Argentina and Sarandí, as well as the corvettes Espora and Rosales, was tasked to participate in joint exercises with the US Navy's George Washington carrier task group. The exercises were the first to take place between the two navies in several years.
