= ARA Almirante Storni (P-53) =

Bouchard-class offshore patrol vessel of the Argentinian Navy

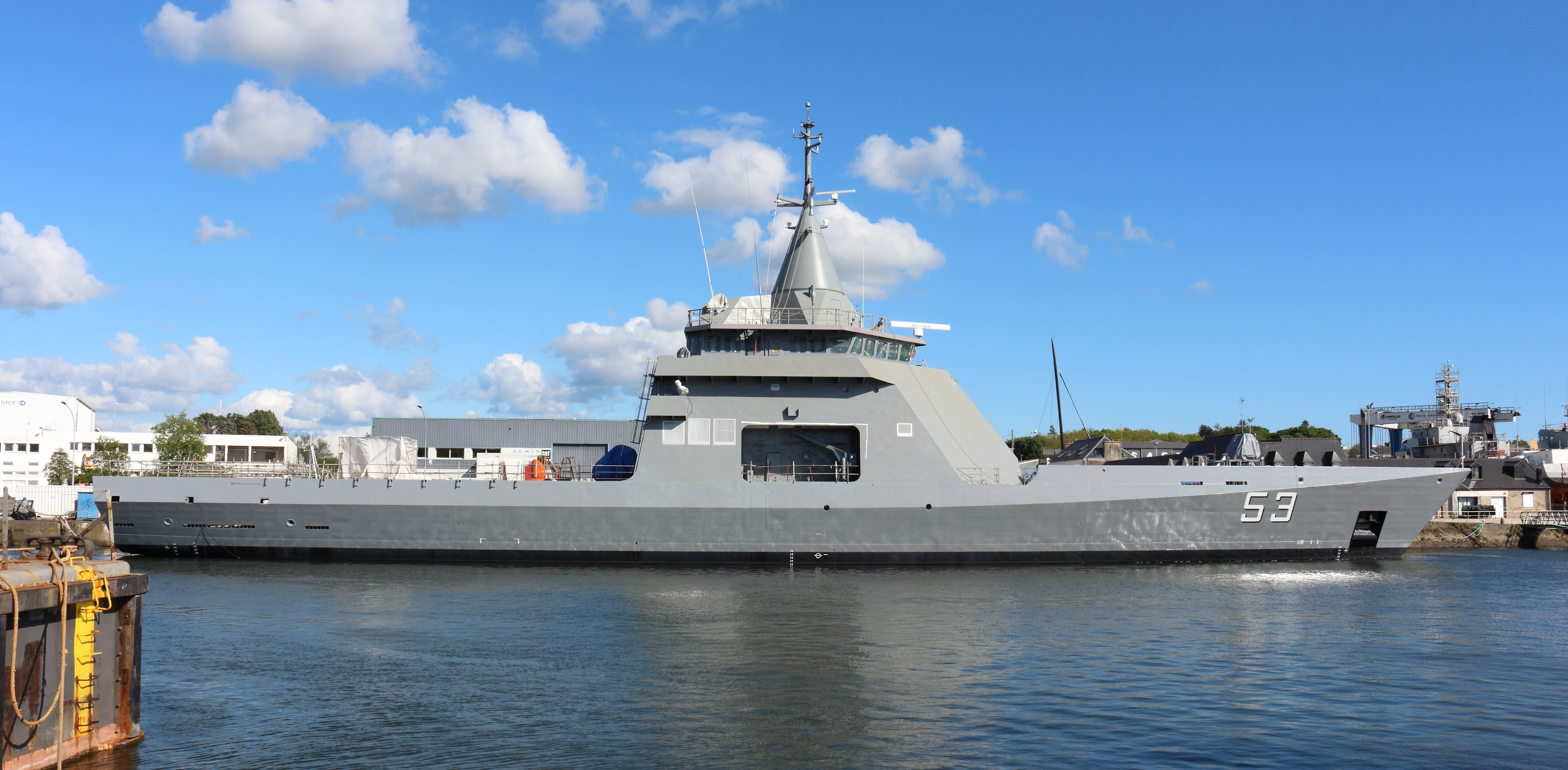
- ARA Almirante Storni in the port of Concarneau

History

Argentina
- Name: Almirante Storni
- Namesake: Segundo Rosa Storni
- Ordered: 2019
- Builder: Kership, Lorient
- Launched: 10 May 2021
- Acquired: 13 October 2021
- Identification: Pennant number: P-53

General characteristics
- Class & type: Kership offshore patrol vessel
- Displacement: 1,450 t (1,430 long tons) (full load)
- Length: 87 m (285 ft 5 in)
- Beam: 11 m (36 ft 1 in)
- Draft: 3.3 m (10 ft 10 in)
- Installed power: Electrical:
- Propulsion: 2 Anglo Belgian Corporation V12 diesel engines, 5.6 MW (7,500 hp)
- Speed: 21 knots (39 km/h; 24 mph)
- Range: 8,000 nmi (14,800 km; 9,200 mi) at 12 knots (22 km/h; 14 mph)
- Endurance: 30 days
- Boats & landing craft carried: 2 × 9 m (30 ft) RHIBs
- Complement: 30 core crew, up to 29 troops
- Sensors & processing systems: DCNS Polaris combat management system; Terma Scanter 6002 I-Band surface search radar; Terma Scanter 4102 I-Band air and surface search radar; Sagem EOMS (Electro Optical Multisensor System) NG; Sagem SIGMA 40D Inertial measurement unit; LinkSrechts Helicopter visual landing aid system
- Electronic warfare & decoys: Thales Altesse & Vigile LW ESM/COMINT system; Lacroix Defense & Security Sylena decoy system
- Armament: 1 × Leonardo 30 mm Marlin cannon; 2 × .50 cal machine guns
- Aircraft carried: 1 × 5-ton helicopter or 1 × 10-ton helicopter (supported); RUAS-160 naval drone (one UAV to be acquired by the navy; service entry mid-2020s; further orders may follow)
- Aviation facilities: Helicopter pad and hangar

ARA Almirante Storni (P-53) is the third Gowind-class offshore patrol vessel constructed for the Argentinian Navy.

The French shipbuilder Naval Group launched the hull of ARA Almirante Storni on 10 May 2021 at Lanester, before moving it to Concarneau for fitting out. It is the second ship of the Argentine Navy to be named after the former Minister of the Navy and Vice Admiral Segundo Rosa Storni. The first was the Fletcher-class destroyer ARA Almirante Storni (D-24).

== Career ==
In May 2024, Almirante Storni, in conjunction with her sister ships Bartolomé Cordero and Piedrabuena, the destroyers La Argentina and Sarandí, as well as the corvettes Espora and Rosales, was tasked to participate in joint exercises with the US Navy's George Washington carrier task group. The exercises were the first to take place between the two navies in several years.

In August 2024, she took part in joint exercise Fraterno XXXVII in the South Atlantic along with the destroyer Sarandí and corvette Espora, as well as the Brazilian Navy's frigate Liberal and submarine Tikuna. The exercise's anti-submarine warfare element focused on reconnaissance, sonar tracking, search and attack by surface units, whereas the maritime element focused on joint air defense coordination, tactical formations and joint helicopter maneuvers.
