= ARA Piedrabuena (P-52) =

Bouchard-class offshore patrol vessel of the Argentinian Navy

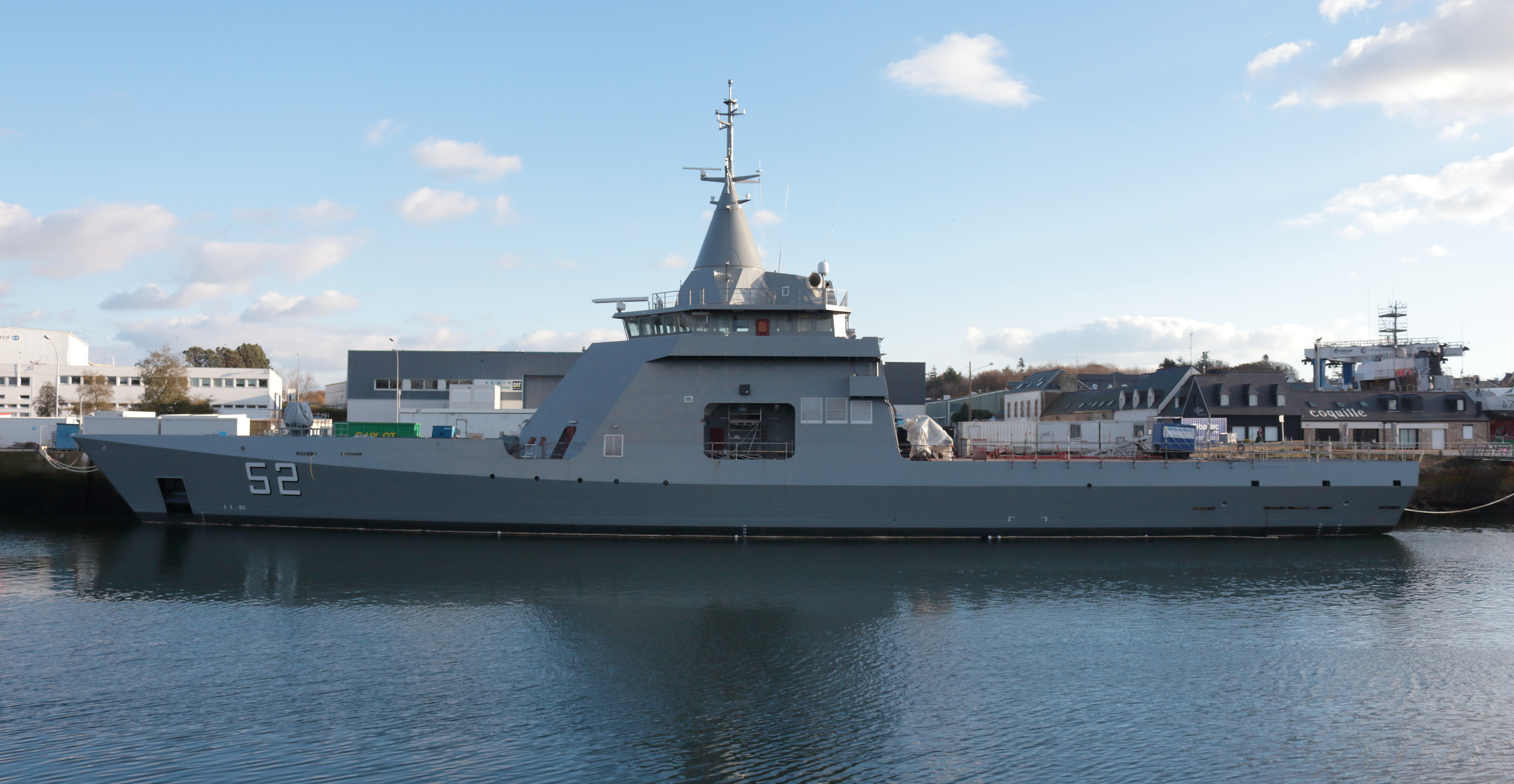
- ARA Piedrabuena (P-52)

History

Argentina
- Name: Piedrabuena
- Namesake: Piedrabuena
- Ordered: 2018
- Builder: DCNS, Lorient (now Kership)
- Laid down: 2019
- Launched: 1 October 2020
- Acquired: 13 April 2021
- Identification: Pennant number: P-52
- Status: Delivered

General characteristics
- Class & type: Kership offshore patrol vessel
- Displacement: 1,450 t (1,430 long tons) (full load)
- Length: 87 m (285 ft 5 in)
- Beam: 11 m (36 ft 1 in)
- Draft: 3.3 m (10 ft 10 in)
- Installed power: Electrical:
- Propulsion: 2 Anglo Belgian Corporation V12 diesel engines, 5.6 MW (7,500 hp)
- Speed: 21 knots (39 km/h; 24 mph)
- Range: 8,000 nmi (14,800 km; 9,200 mi) at 12 knots (22 km/h; 14 mph)
- Endurance: 30 days
- Boats & landing craft carried: 2 × 9 m (30 ft) RHIBs
- Complement: 30 core crew, up to 29 troops
- Sensors & processing systems: DCNS Polaris combat management system; Terma Scanter 6002 I-Band surface search radar; Terma Scanter 4102 I-Band air and surface search radar; Sagem EOMS (Electro Optical Multisensor System) NG; Sagem SIGMA 40D Inertial measurement unit; LinkSrechts Helicopter visual landing aid system
- Electronic warfare & decoys: Thales Altesse & Vigile LW ESM/COMINT system; Lacroix Defense & Security Sylena decoy system
- Armament: 1 × Leonardo 30 mm Marlin cannon; 2 × .50 cal machine guns
- Aircraft carried: 1 × 5-ton helicopter or 1 × 10-ton helicopter (supported); RUAS-160 naval drone (one UAV to be acquired by the navy; service entry mid-2020s; further orders may follow)
- Aviation facilities: Helicopter pad and hangar

ARA Piedrabuena (P-52) is the second ship of Argentine Gowind-class offshore patrol vessel of the Argentine Navy.

== Development and design ==
After repeated negotiations and break-offs, in February 2018 the Argentine Navy was instructed to restart negotiations with Naval Group for the procurement of four Gowind-class vessels. The decision was motivated by the meeting between Argentine President Mauricio Macri and French President Emmanuel Macron at the annual World Economic Forum summit in Davos, Switzerland. An order for four vessels was expected in July 2018. In November 2018, Argentina confirmed the purchase of four Gowind-class vessels. The purchase includes the already-built L'Adroit, which in 2016 visited the region on a marketing trip, and three new vessels.

== Construction and career ==
Piedrabuena was laid down in 2019 and launched on 1 October 2020 by DCNS in Lorient. The vessel began sea trials in March 2021. It was formally delivered to the Argentine Navy in April 2021.

In May 2024, Piedrabuena, in conjunction with her sister ships Bartolomé Cordero and Almirante Storni, the destroyers La Argentina and Sarandí, as well as the corvettes Espora and Rosales, was tasked to participate in joint exercises with the US Navy's George Washington carrier task group. The exercises were the first to take place between the two navies in several years.

== See also ==
- ARA Bouchard (P-51)
