= ARA Almirante Storni =

At least two ships of the Argentine Navy have been named Almirante Storni:

- ARA Almirante Storni (D-24), a Fletcher-class destroyer launched in 1943 as USS Cowell acquired in 1971 and scrapped in 1982
- ARA Almirante Storni (P-53), a Gowind-class corvette launched in 2021
