= ARA Bouchard =

At least three ships of the Argentine Navy have been named Bouchard:

- ARA Bouchard (M-7), a Bouchard-class minesweeper commissioned in 1937 and transferred to Paraguay as Nanawa in 1964.
- ARA Bouchard (D-26), an Allen M. Sumner-class destroyer launched in 1944 as USS Borie and renamed on transfer in 1972. She was scrapped in 1984.
- ARA Bouchard (P-51), a Gowind-class patrol vessel commissioned in 2012 as French L'Adroit and renamed on transfer in 2019.
