= Brazilian frigate Constituição (F42) =

Niterói-class Frigates

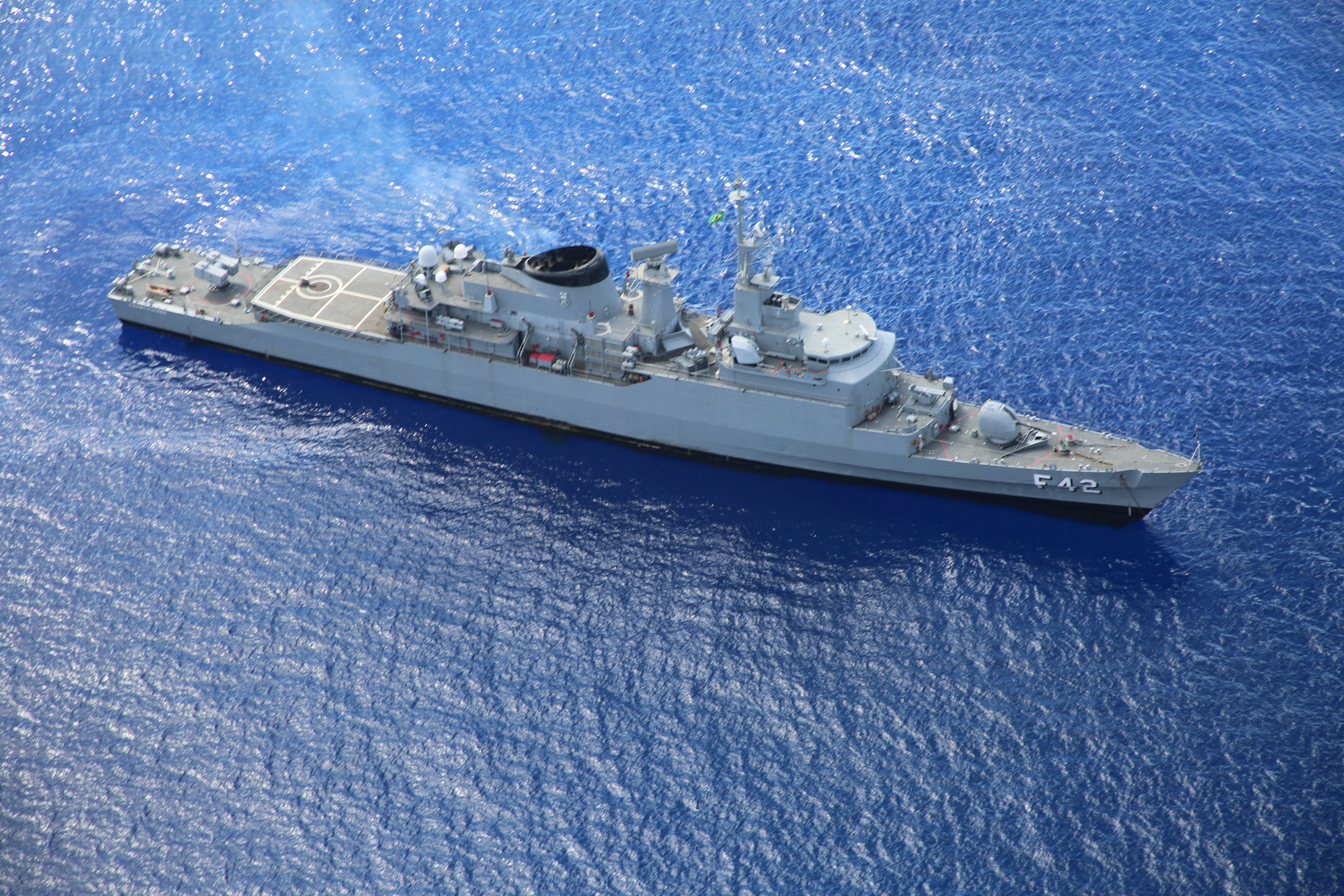
- Constituição

History

Brazil
- Name: Constituição
- Namesake: Constitution of Brazil
- Builder: Vosper Thornycroft
- Launched: 15 April 1976
- Christened: 13 March 1974
- Commissioned: 31 March 1978
- Home port: Rio de Janeiro
- Identification: MMSI number: 710465000; Callsign: PWCO; Pennant number: F-42
- Nickname(s): Urso ("Bear")
- Status: Active

General characteristics
- Type: Niterói-class frigate
- Displacement: 3.355 t (3.302 long tons)
- Length: 129.2 m (423 ft 11 in)
- Beam: 13.5 m (44 ft 3 in)
- Draught: 5.5 m (18 ft 1 in)
- Propulsion: CODOG, two shafts; 2 × Rolls-Royce Olympus TM-3B gas turbines 42,000 kW (56,000 hp) combined; 4 × MTU 16V 956 TB91 diesel engines 13,000 kW (17,000 hp) combined
- Speed: 30 knots (56 km/h; 35 mph) (maximum); 22 knots (41 km/h; 25 mph) (diesels only)
- Range: 5,300 nmi (9,800 km; 6,100 mi)
- Endurance: 45 days
- Complement: 217
- Sensors & processing systems: Modernized: Alenia RAN-20S air search radar; Terma Scanter surface search radar; Orion RTN-30X fire control radar; Saab EOS-400 optronic director; Krupp Atlas EDO-610E hull mounted sonar; SICONTA Mk 2 C3I system
- Electronic warfare & decoys: Modernized: Cutlass B1W ESM; ET/SQL-1 ECM; 12 × 102 mm decoy launchers
- Armament: Modernized: 1 × Albatros launcher for 8 Aspide surface-to-air missiles; 1 × 114 mm Mark 8 gun; 2 × Bofors 40 mm guns; 2 × twin launchers for Exocet anti-ship missiles; 2 × triple torpedo tubes for Mark 46 torpedoes; 1 × double-barrel Bofors Boroc anti-submarine rockets
- Aircraft carried: Westland Super Lynx Mk.21B helicopter
- Aviation facilities: Helipad and hangar

Constituição (F42) is a Niterói-class frigate of the Brazilian Navy. The Constituição was the third ship of the class ordered by the Brazilian Navy, on 20 September 1970. The Constituição was launched on 15 April 1976, and was commissioned on 31 March 1978.

== History ==
In June 2009, Constituição participated in the recovery mission for the wreckage of Air France Flight 447.

On 20 February 2010, the Constituição brought twelve students, faculty, and crew of the tall ship Concordia ashore after they were initially rescued by merchant vessels. The Concordia, a tall ship floating classroom operated by the West Island College International's Class Afloat program, was abandoned approximately 300 nautical miles (560 km) south east of Rio de Janeiro with all 64 people aboard making it to life rafts. The remaining 52 students, faculty, and crew were to be transferred from merchant vessels to the Constituição and another Brazilian frigate, but weather and other concerns prevented that.

On 4 December 2012, she left her homeport in Rio on her first voyage towards Beirut, where she would take up duty as the flagship of the UNIFIL Maritime Task Force. The ship had a complement of 250 men, including 19 Naval Fusiliers from the Asymmetrical Threats Reaction Group and 9 GRUMEC operators. On her voyage, Constituição visited the Canary Islands from 21 to 24 December, crossed the Strait of Gibraltar in 27 December and docked at Civitavecchia from 31 December to 4 January 2013. She arrived at Beirut on 10 January, relieving Liberal as the MTF flagship on 13 January.

On 9 February 2013, she reached the milestone of 2,500 days at sea. She visited Mersin from 18 to 21 April, receiving aviation fuel via STS from the Turkish frigate TCG Gaziantep. Constituição's first tenure as the MTF flagship would remain until 17 July, when she was relieved by União. She would once again take up duty as UNIFIL's MTF flagship in 2014, arriving at Beirut to replace Liberal in 14 August.
