= ARA Espora =

At least two ships of the Argentine Navy have been named Espora:

- ARA Espora (D-21), a Fletcher-class destroyer launched in 1943 as USS Dortch and renamed on transfer to Argentina in 1961. She was scrapped in 1977.
- ARA Espora (P-41), an Espora-class corvette launched in 1982
