= Voith Maxima =

Family of Diesel-hydraulic locomotives

Voith Maxima family
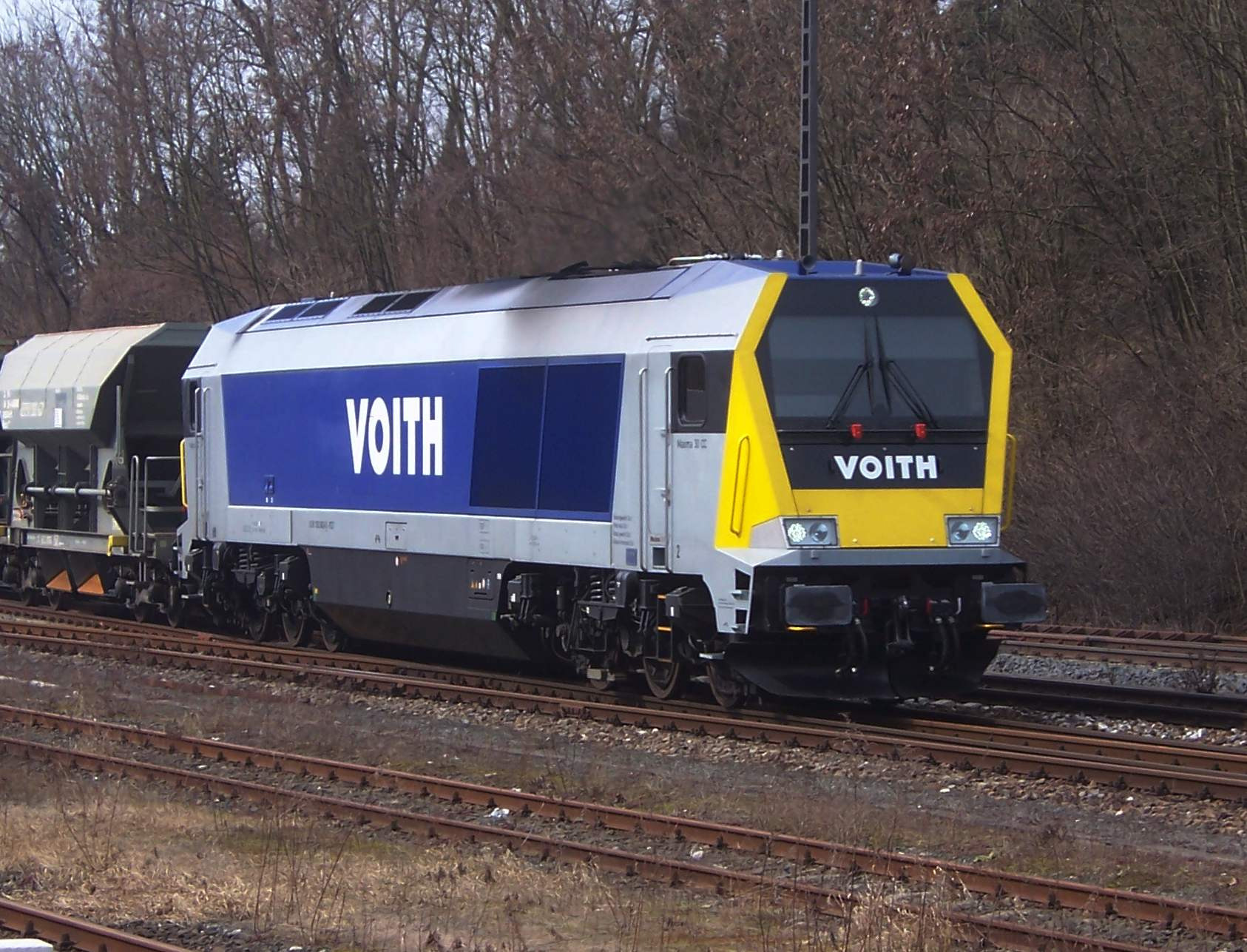
Type and origin
- Power type: Diesel
- Designer: MA Design/Voith Turbo
- Builder: Voith Turbo; Legios
- Build date: 2006–2010
- Total produced: 13 (Maxima 40CC); 6 (Maxima 30CC)
Specifications
- Configuration
  - UIC: (C')(C')
- Gauge: 1,435 mm
- Length: 30CC and 40CC: 23.2 m (76 ft 1 in); 20BB: 16.5 to 19.5 m (54 ft 2 in to 64 ft 0 in)
- Axle load: 30CC and 40CC: 126–135 t (124–133 long tons; 139–149 short tons); 20BB:
- Fuel type: Diesel
- Fuel capacity: 40CC: up to 9,000 L (2,000 imp gal; 2,400 US gal); 30CC: up to 10,000 L (2,200 imp gal; 2,600 US gal); 20BB: 2,000–5,000 L (440–1,100 imp gal; 530–1,320 US gal)
- Engine type: 40CC: ABC 16VDZC; 30CC: ABC 12VDZC
- Transmission: 30CC and 40CC: Voith LS 640 reU2 ("Turbosplit"); 20CC: ?
- Loco brake: Electro-pneumatic and Hydro-dynamic
- Safety systems: PZB, ATB, TBL and others
Performance figures
- Maximum speed: 30CC and 40CC: 120 km/h (75 mph); 20BB: 140 km/h (87 mph)
- Power output: 40CC: 3,600 kW (4,800 hp) @ 1,000 rpm 30CC: 2,750 kW (3,690 hp) @ 1,000 rpm 20BB: 1,500–3,000 kW (2,000–4,000 hp) @ 1,800 rpm
- Tractive effort: 30CC and 40CC (continuous): 408 kN (92,000 lbf) @ μ = 0.33 30CC and 40CC (starting): 519 kN (117,000 lbf) @ μ = 0.33 20BB (continuous): 233–290 kN (52,000–65,000 lbf) @ μ = 0.33
Career
- Locale: Germany, Poland, Benelux and others
- Disposition: In service
- Sources : except where other given

V500.06 of SGL climbing the Schiefe Ebene

The Voith Maxima are a family of diesel-hydraulic locomotives built by Voith Turbo Lokomotivtechnik GmbH & Co. KG., a subsidiary of Voith.

Initially, two versions of a 6-axle C'C' machine were offered with medium speed engines from the Anglo-Belgian Corporation: the Maxima 30CC and Maxima 40CC (the most powerful single-engined diesel-hydraulic locomotive in the world, rated at 3,600 kW (4,800 hp)). In 2008 a third model, the four-axle Maxima 20 BB, was added to the range. In January 2010, Czech company Lostr (after September 2010 renamed Legios) signed an agreement to manufacture under license the Voith Maxima locomotives. The Czech built locomotives were marketed as Legios General.

== History ==
=== Background ===
Voith had supplied components to the railway industry since the 1930s - in particular its hydraulic transmissions.

Merger of the Deutsche Reichsbahn and Deutsche Bundesbahn in the 1994 resulted in the German state railways acquiring many high-powered diesel locomotives of the DR Class 130 family, which reduced any opportunities for sale of a high power transmission to the Deutsche Bahn in the medium term.

However, in 2004 Nord-Ostsee-Bahn acquired a contract to operate the Marschbahn from December 2005, and contracted Vossloh to build new locomotives (R3000 CC) to operate it; the locomotive's design specifications were a top speed of 160 km/h (99 mph) and power of over 3 MW. Initially the service was to be operated by the MaK DE 2700 type, before the new R3000 locomotives were built. The LS 640 reU2 transmission (input power 4.2 MW) was a result of development work by Voith for the R3000 locomotive's transmission. The 'Turbo Split' LS 640 transmission was first exhibited at Innotrans in 2004 - a key feature of the new transmission was the ability to separately control two outputs from the input - enabling wheelslip control per bogie.

In 2005, Vossloh acquired Alstom's Meinfesa plant (Valencia, Spain), and with it a license to manufacturer GM-EMD based diesel electric locomotives, and as a result, it abandoned the R3000 development, instead offering the Vossloh Euro and Vossloh G2000 designs for mainline work. The Euro 4000 was offered to the Marschbahn instead of the R3000.

Because it lost an outlet for its new transmission, Voith began development of a new high-powered mainline locomotive - the Voith Maxima.

=== Maxima and Gravita development ===
Voith then developed in house new high-powered diesel locomotive series along with single cab shunting and trip freight locomotives, the Voith Gravita series. With a development period of just 500 days, the first locomotive was ready in 2006 and presented at the InnoTrans 2006 fair. The locomotive design won a red dot design award in 2007. A new factory in Kiel was established in 2006 by Voith to manufacture the new locomotives.

At Innotrans in 2008, Voith added a third potential model to its Maxima range, the four-axle Maxima 20BB. The type was expected to be a competitor for a 200 locomotive order from Deutsche Bahn for diesel locomotives for passenger and freight services to replace the DB V 160 family of locomotives; (Note: The specifications of the order included: a locomotive capable of hauling a 6 car double decker train at 140 km/h with surplus force of 30kN, a train power supply rated at 300kW, and tractive effort of at least 236kN) in 2011 the Deutsche Bahn AG order was won by Bombardier Transportation with a new multi-engine type of its TRAXX platform.

=== Career and orders ===
After the exhibition of the demonstrator locomotive at the InnoTrans 2006 fair, it was tested on several German main lines to receive German certification. It was also tested on the Velim test ring and also went to Norway and Sweden for thermal testing. Final German certification was granted on 23 December 2008 by the German rail authority EBA.

A second demonstrator locomotive was built and equipped with Dutch and Belgian safety systems for obtaining Dutch and Belgian certification. It was tested in the first and second quarter of 2008 in the Netherlands, and in Belgium in the fourth quarter. After Dutch and Belgian certification, the locomotive will be passed on to HGK for testing.

A third and last demonstrator locomotive is being built and will be used to obtain certification in Poland, Sweden and Norway.

As of 2008, 32 locomotives have been ordered, with options for a further 29:

- Ox-traction, a Dutch leasing company in which Voith held a 44% stake, was to order 15 Maxima 40CC and 15 Maxima 30CC locomotives, with a potential option of a further 23 Maxima locomotives. Its first Maxima 40CC locomotive was delivered in April 2009 and was immediately leased to LOCON.
  In August 2010 Ox-traction ended its business activities. Locomotives previously leased and marketed over Ox-traction are now leased directly from Voith.
- HVLE ordered 2 Maxima 40CC locomotives. The first was delivered in April 2009, the second in April 2010. HVLE took an option on a further 6 locomotives.

== Technology ==
The locomotive's body consists entirely of steel. Both cabins have two seats (one for the train driver and one for a relief driver or supervisor) and have a standardised and ergonomical control desk. The cabins also have air conditioning and are equipped with all modern needs of today's operating conditions.

Powered by either an 16VDZC or 12VDZC engine by Belgian engine manufacturer Anglo-Belgian Corporation, rated at 2,750 kW (3,690 hp) to 3,600 kW (4,800 hp) respectively, the locomotive can reach a top speed of 120 km/h (75 mph) (160 km/h (99 mph) optionally) with a starting tractive effort of 519 kN (117,000 lbf). The normal continuous tractive effort is 408 kN (92,000 lbf). The 'Turbo Split' LS 640 reU2 transmission allows for a separated traction and wheelslip control of each bogie, being the first locomotive series equipped with this new technology. Brake equipment consists of electro-pneumatic and engine compression brakes. The smallest drivable curve radius is 80 m (260 ft). The locomotive can take up to 9,000 or 10,000 L (2,000 or 2,200 imp gal; 2,400 or 2,600 US gal) of fuel, depending on the configuration.

The locomotives are assembled at a new plant next to the Nord-Ostsee-Kanal in Kiel. Large maintenance and overhauls will be carried out in a new central workshop in Cologne, to be operated jointly by Voith Turbo and HGK.

== Variants ==
Voith initially offered two variants of this locomotive: the most powerful version is the Maxima 40CC with 3,600 kW (4,800 hp) power, intended for freight operators with heavy trains of up to 3,000 metric tons (3,000 long tons; 3,300 short tons). A less powerful version is the Maxima 30CC with 2,750 kW (3,690 hp) power, primarily intended for freight operators with trains of up to 2,500 t (2,500 long tons; 2,800 short tons) or passenger operators. A third version the Maxima 20BB was added to the range in 2007.

== Models ==
Voith signed an exclusive contract with Saxon model building company Sächsische Waggonfabrik Stollberg to build a H0-model of both Maxima variants. All parts of the locomotive will be engineered and made in Germany.

== See also ==
- EMD JT42CWR, GE PowerHaul and Vossloh Euro 4000 are contemporary competitors to the Voith Maxima.
- List of Voith transmissions
- Voith Gravita
