= ARA La Argentina (D-11) =

1981 Almirante Brown-class destroyer

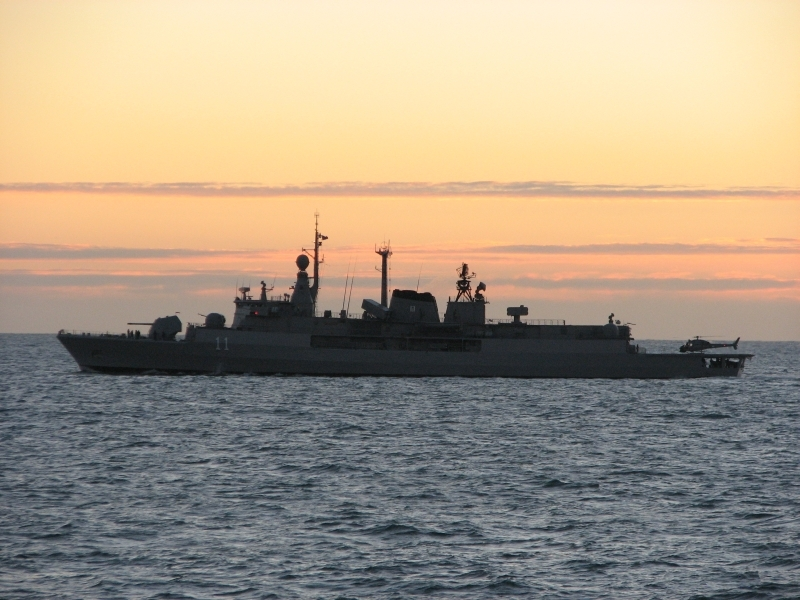
- ARA La Argentina

History

Argentina
- Name: La Argentina
- Builder: Blohm + Voss
- Launched: 25 September 1981
- Acquired: 11 May 1983
- Commissioned: 4 August 1983
- Status: in active service
- Notes: Pennant number: D-11

General characteristics
- Class & type: Almirante Brown-class destroyer
- Displacement: 3,360 tons
- Length: 126 m (413 ft 5 in)
- Beam: 14 m (45 ft 11 in)
- Draught: 5.8 m (19 ft 0 in)
- Propulsion: COGAG (4 turbines); 36,000 shp (27,000 kW)
- Speed: 30.5 knots (56.5 km/h; 35.1 mph)
- Range: 4,500 nmi (8,300 km; 5,200 mi)
- Complement: 224
- Armament: 8 × Aérospatiale MM40 Exocet anti-ship missiles; 1 × Selenia/Elsag Albatross octuple launcher with 24 Aspide surface-to-air missiles; 1 × Oto Melara 127 mm dual purpose gun; 8 × Bofors 40 mm L/70 anti-aircraft guns (4 × twin); 6 × 324 mm torpedo tubes (2 × 3)
- Aircraft carried: 1 × Aérospatiale AS 555 Fennec helicopter
- Aviation facilities: Single hangar

ARA La Argentina (pennant number D-11) is the second ship of the MEKO 360H2 series of four destroyers built for the Argentine Navy. The ship is the eighth ship in the history of the Argentine Navy to bear the name of the corsair frigate La Argentina which conducted a privateer raid around the world against Spanish trade in 1817.

== Origin ==
La Argentina and her sister ships were authorized under the Naval Construction National Plan of 1974, an initiative by the Argentine Navy to replace old World War II-vintage warships which were nearing the end of their operational lives. A contract was signed with the Blohm + Voss Shipyards in Hamburg, West Germany for the construction of four MEKO 360H2 destroyers.

== Construction ==
La Argentina was launched on 25 September 1981. The ship was delivered to the Argentine Navy on 11 May 1983 for her sea trials, following which the ship departed for Argentina, arriving at Puerto Belgrano Naval Base on 18 July and being formally commissioned into the Navy on 4 August of that same year.

== Service history ==
The ship emerged in 2006 from an overhaul which included the extension of her flight deck to allow for the operation of SH-3 Sea King helicopters.

She is home-ported at Puerto Belgrano as part of the Navy's Destroyer Division, along with her two (as of 2024) sister ships.

The Argentine Navy struggled to meet maintenance and training requirements because of financial problems and import restrictions. The Almirante Brown class were reported to be short of spares and suffering engine problems, plus all their ordnance was past its expiry date. As a result, La Argentina suffered a major breakdown in 2012.

On 30 June 2017, La Argentina accidentally collided with a jetty while departing Punta Alta Naval Base for an international naval exercise in the Pacific. The collision resulted in a gash in La Argentina's bow. She was quickly repaired, but while undergoing repairs, a fire broke out after an incident with welding equipment. Repairs were completed however, and La Argentina departed for Peru on 5 July 2017.

In May 2024, La Argentina, in conjunction with her sister ship Sarandí and the corvettes Espora and Rosales, as well as the offshore patrol vessels Bartolomé Cordero, Piedrabuena and Almirante Storni, was tasked to participate in joint exercises with the US Navy's George Washington carrier task group. The exercises were the first to take place between the two navies in several years.
