= ARA Rosales (P-42) =

Espora-class corvette of the Argentine Navy

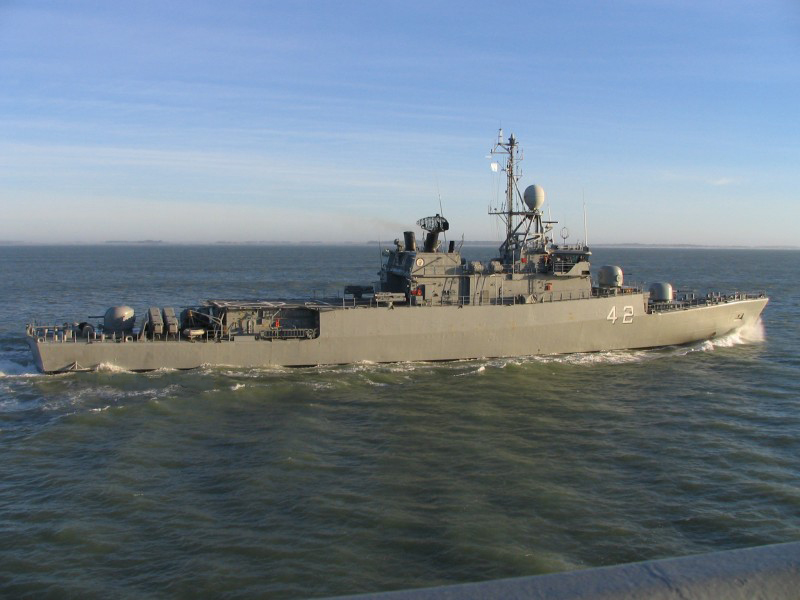
- Espora-class corvette ARA Rosales (P-42)

History

Argentina
- Name: Rosales
- Namesake: Leonardo Rosales
- Builder: Río Santiago Shipyard
- Laid down: 1 April 1981
- Launched: 4 March 1983
- Acquired: 14 November 1986
- Commissioned: 24 March 1987
- Home port: Puerto Belgrano
- Status: Active

General characteristics
- Class & type: MEKO 140A16 Espora-class corvette
- Displacement: 1,560 tons (1,790 tons full load)
- Length: 91.2 m (299 ft 3 in)
- Beam: 11.0 m (36 ft 1 in)
- Draught: 3.33 m (10 ft 11 in) (hull)
- Installed power: 22,600 bhp (16.9 MW)
- Propulsion: 2 × SEMT Pielstick 16 PC 2-5 V400 diesels, 2 × 5-blade props
- Speed: 27 knots (50 km/h; 31 mph)
- Range: 4,000 nmi (7,400 km; 4,600 mi) at 18 knots (33 km/h; 21 mph)
- Complement: 11 officers, 46 petty officers, 36 enlisted
- Sensors & processing systems: Thales DA-05/2 air/surface search; Thales WM-28, LIROD fire control; Decca TM 1226 navigation; Atlas AQS-1 hull MF sonar
- Electronic warfare & decoys: Decca RDC-2ABC; Decca RCM-2 jammer; 2 × Matra Dagaie decoys
- Armament: 4 × MM38 Exocet anti-ship missiles; 1 × 76 mm/62 OTO Melara dual purpose gun; 2 × DARDO twin 40 mm AA guns; 2 × .50 cal. machine guns; 2 × triple 324 mm ILAS-3 tubes (WASS A-244S torpedoes)
- Aviation facilities: Helideck for Eurocopter Fennec

ARA Rosales (P-42) is the second ship of the MEKO 140A16 Espora class of six corvettes built for the Argentine Navy. The ship is the fourth ship to bear the name of Colonel (Navy) Leonardo Rosales, who fought in the Argentine Navy during Argentina's war of independence and the Cisplatine War.

The Argentine Navy struggles to meet maintenance and training requirements because of financial problems and import restrictions. The availability of spare parts was a problem as of 2012 and by 2019 she was reported in reserve and to be scrapped. However, in 2021 she underwent repair work at the Tandanor shipyard and returned to service in 2022.

== Origin ==
Rosales and her sister ships were part of the 1974 Naval Constructions National Plan, an initiative by the Argentine Navy to replace old World War II-vintage ships with more advanced warships. The original plan called for six MEKO 360H2 destroyers, four of them to be built in Argentina, but the plan was later modified to include four MEKO destroyers and six corvettes for anti-surface warfare and patrol operations.

== Construction ==
Rosales was constructed at the Río Santiago Shipyard of the Astilleros y Fábricas Navales del Estado (State Shipyards and Naval Factories) state corporation. Her keel was laid on 1 April 1981 and was launched on 4 March 1983. The ship was officially delivered to the Navy on 14 November 1986 and formally commissioned on 24 March 1987. First captain was Capitan de Navio Manuel Augusto Iricibar.

== Service history ==
In February 1991, as part of Task Group 88.1 Rosales along with ARA Bahía San Blas participated as part of the Coalition of the Gulf War in the United Nations-mandated blockade of Iraq following its invasion of Kuwait. She participated in patrol and escort missions as part of Operations Desert Shield and Desert Storm, returning to Argentina in July 1991.

Rosales participated in several naval exercises and conducted fishery patrol duties in the Argentine exclusive economic zone, capturing two illegal fishing ships in 1992.

She is homeported at Puerto Belgrano Naval Base and is part of the 2nd Corvette Division with her five sister ships. In 2019, it was announced by the Argentine Navy that the vessel would be scrapped. However, one year later training activities were still being conducted on her. In 2021 it was reported that she was being repaired for a return to service. The maintenance work was completed at the Tandanor Shipyard and she was returned to service.

In 2022, she participated in an exercise off the coast of Mar del Plata with the destroyer Sarandí, her sister ships Robinson and Espora and the transport ship Canal Beagle.

In May 2024, Rosales, in conjunction with her sister ship Espora and the destroyers La Argentina and Sarandí, as well as the offshore patrol vessels Bartolomé Cordero, Piedrabuena and Almirante Storni, was tasked to participate in joint exercises with the US Navy's George Washington carrier task group. The exercises were the first to take place between the two navies in several years. In August 2024, Rosales, her sister ship Espora, as well as the destroyers Sarandí and La Argentina, engaged in joint exercises with the Brazilian Navy.
