= GRUMEC =

Brazilian Navy special forces diving unit

Combat Divers Group
- Grupamento de Mergulhadores de Combate
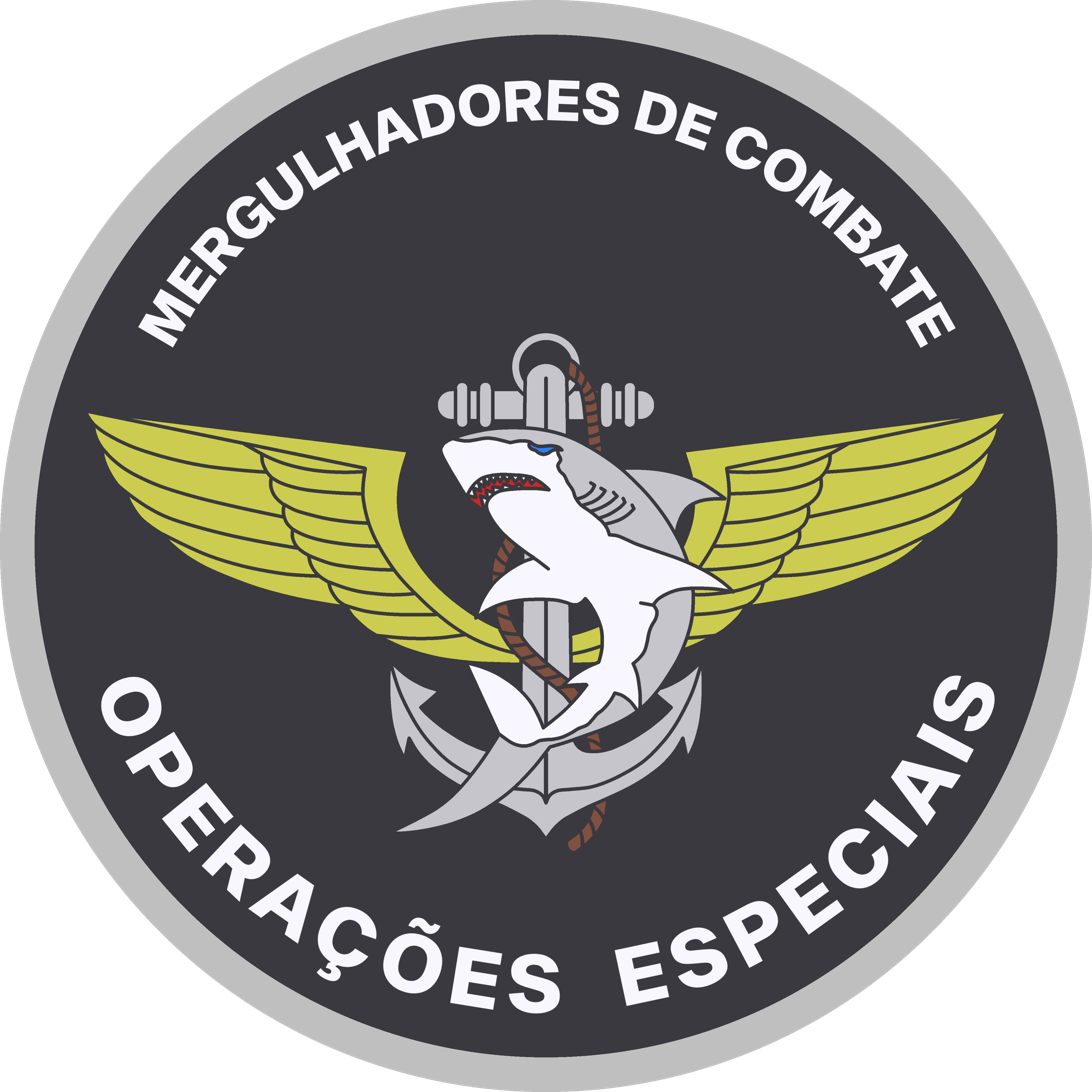
- "Ordem do Tubarão" (Order of the Shark) Insignia
- Active: 10 March 1998; 28 years ago
- Country: Brazil
- Allegiance: Submarine Force Command
- Branch: Brazilian Navy
- Type: Special forces
- Role: Special operations; Special reconnaissance; Counter terrorism; Hostage rescue; Direct action; Amphibious reconnaissance; Unconventional warfare
- Size: Classified
- Garrison/HQ: Mocanguê Grande Island, Niterói, RJ
- Nickname: "Tubarões" (Sharks)
- Motto: Fortuna Audaces Sequitur ("Fortune follows the brave")
- Engagements: United Nations Stabilisation Mission in Haiti; Security operations in Brazil; United Nations Interim Force in Lebanon; Anti-piracy operations in the Gulf of Guinea

Insignia
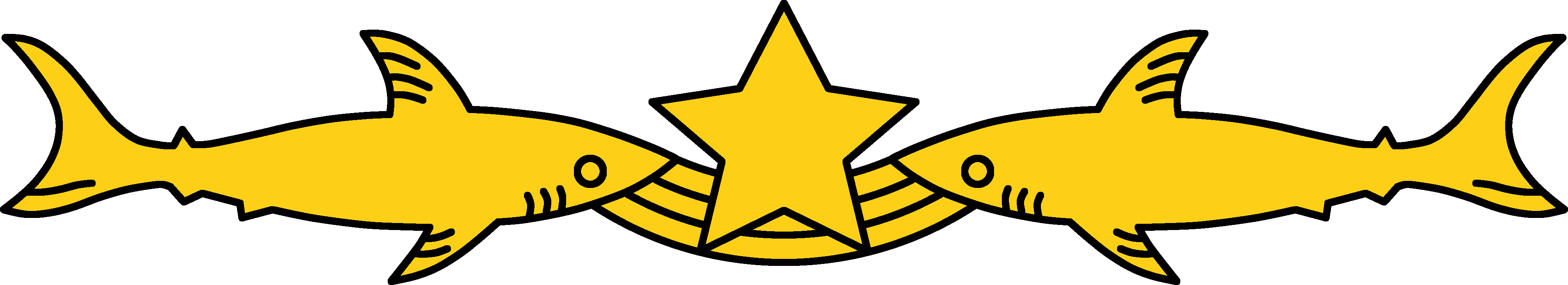
- GRUMEC Brief

The Combat Divers Group (Portuguese: Grupamento de Mergulhadores de Combate), abbreviated to GRUMEC, is a special operations and counterterrorism unit of the Brazilian Navy. Their main attributions include tasks such as reconnaissance, sabotage, hostage rescue and the elimination of targets of strategic value in maritime and riverine environments.

Subordinate to the Submarine Force Command, GRUMEC teams can be deployed from one of the Navy's vessels as well as via rotary-wing and fixed-wing aircraft, mini-submarines, kayaks, via diving or in inflatable boats that can be launched from the submarine while it is still under water.

A member of the force is known as a "MEC", which is an abbreviation of "mergulhador de combate", meaning "combat diver".

== History ==
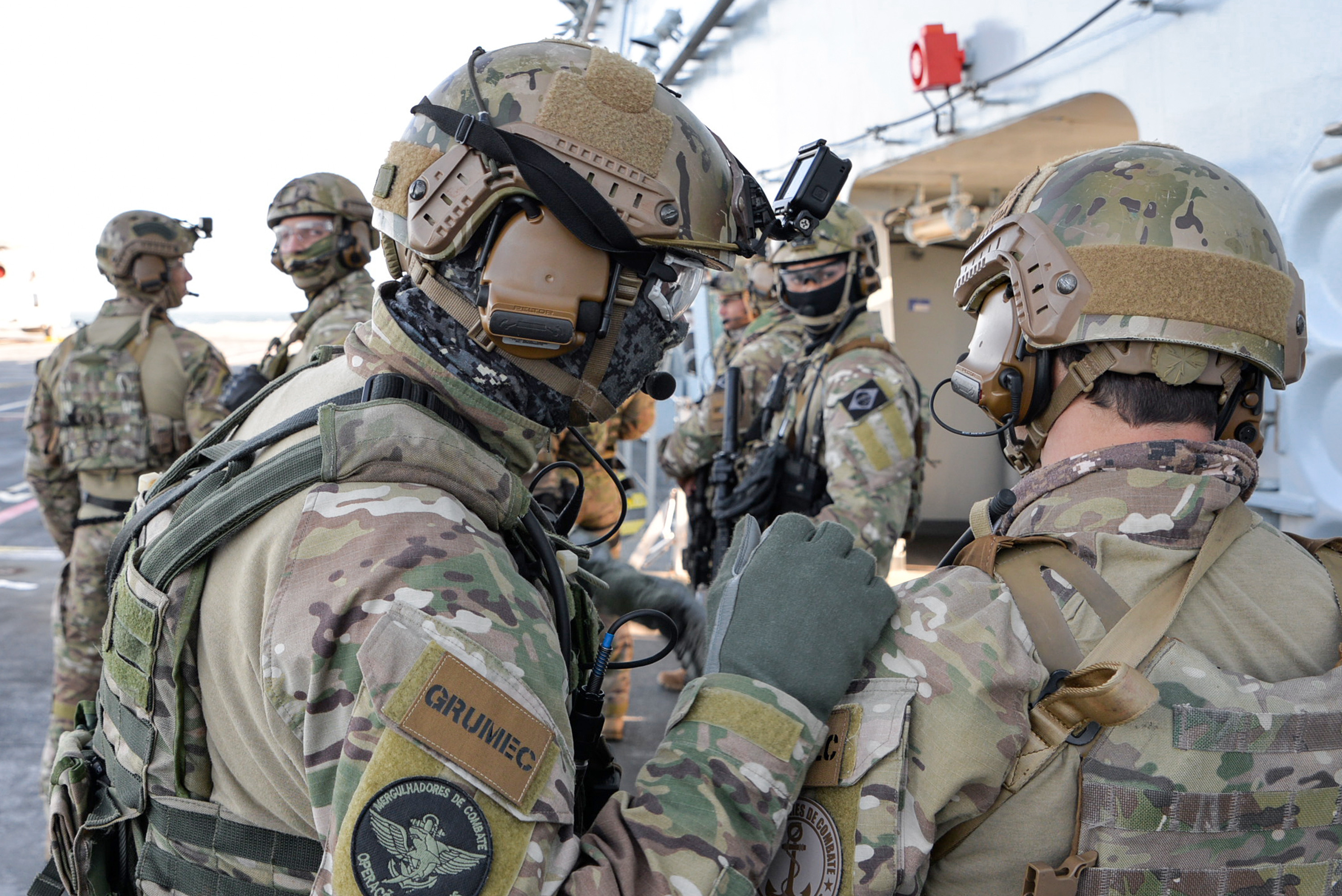
GRUMEC operators during ASPIRANTEX 2019.

GRUMEC's history dates back to 1964, when two officers and two seamen of the Brazilian Navy passed the US's UDT-SEALs course. From their experience, the Divisão de Mergulhadores de Combate (Combat Divers Division) was created in 1970 at the Almirante Castro e Silva Base. Two years later, two officers and three seamen were sent to France, where they passed the "Nageurs de Combat" course. Mixing the French techniques, which focused on diving, with the American doctrine, which also emphasized land operations, the Curso Especial de Mergulhador de Combate (Special Combat Diver Course) was created in 1974, at what is now the Centro de Instrução e Adestramento Almirante Áttila Monteiro Aché (CIAMA).

With the increasing demand for combat divers that followed, this Combat Divers Division was transformed into the Grupo de Mergulhadores de Combate (Combat Divers Group) in 1983, becoming subordinate to the Submarine Force Command. On 12 December 1997, the Grupamento de Mergulhadores de Combate (Combat Divers Group) was created, being activated in the 10th of March 1998.

== Selection ==
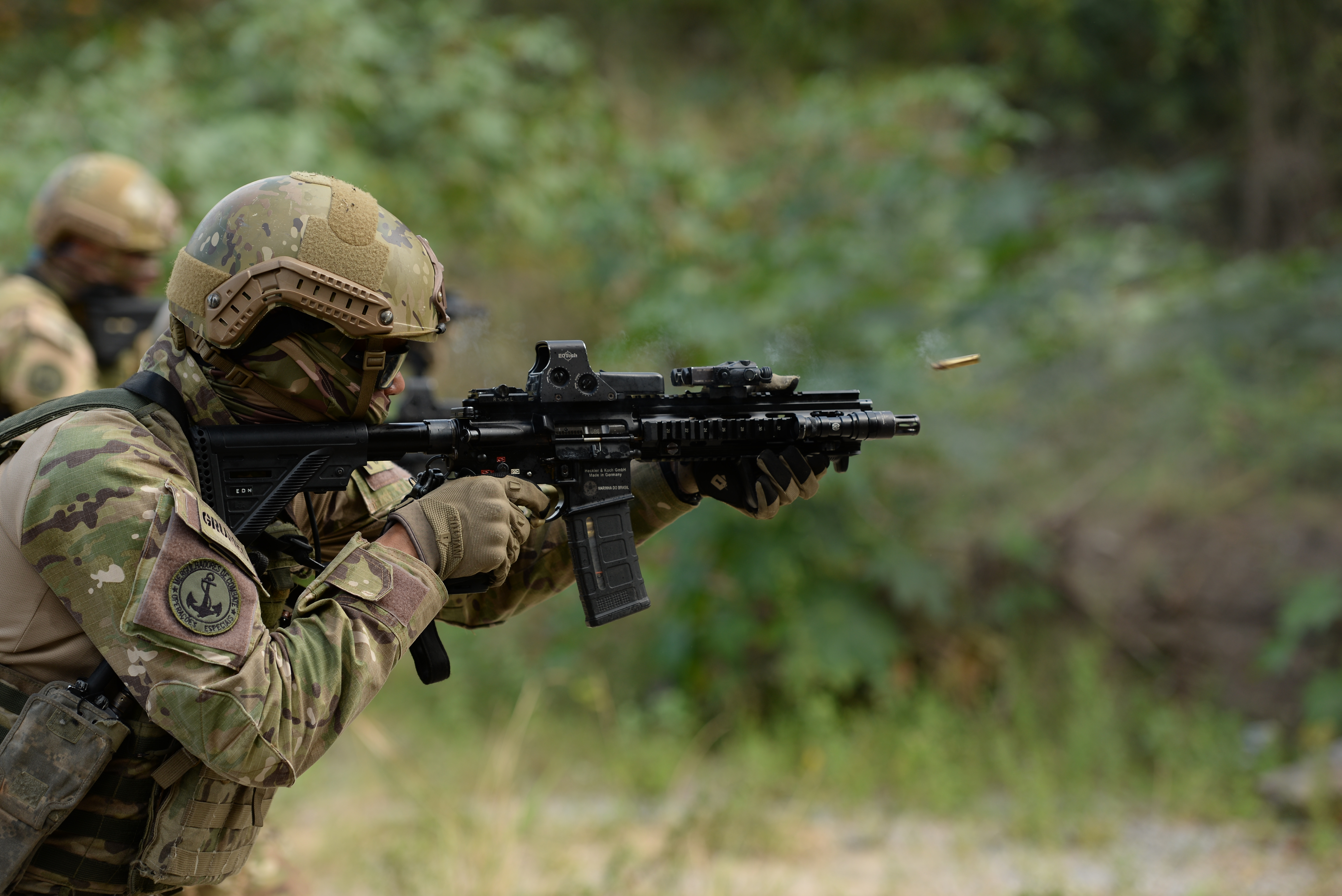
GRUMEC operator firing a HK416 A5

The Brazilian Navy Combat Diver's indoctrination and training methods are similar to other combat diver units such as the American SEALs, British SBS (Special Boat Service) or the Commando Hubert of the French Navy Commandos Marine.

For officers of the Navy, the initial requirements include passing medical and psychological examinations, testing in a recompression chamber and arduous physical tests. The call CAMECO (Enhancement Course of Combat Diver for Officers) lasts 46 weeks, is divided into four phases and aims to enable the military to operate diving equipment, weapons, explosives, tactics and techniques used for unconventional warfare and conflict low intensity, enabling them to perform, in short, the various types of Special Operations. Officers, of course, special emphasis is given to planning operations, but as a whole, the materials include: physical training and military defense; hygiene and first aid campaign, self-contained open-circuit, fighting techniques, riverine operations, demolition, weapons, communications, shore reconnaissance, submarine special operations, military planning process and case study, contemporary management, leadership; introduction to microcomputers, communications system of the Navy, and Intelligence.

For enlisted (corporals or male sergeants with less than 30 years of age and able to reenlist), there is a C-ESP-MEC - Combat Divers Special Course, whose requirements for admission are the same as CAMECO. The duration is 45 weeks of instructional activities also drawn as to the officers, but those who endure the enormous physical and mental pressure of the course will be adequately prepared for the specialized tasks assigned to MECS. GRUMEC training is the longest among Brazilian special operations forces.

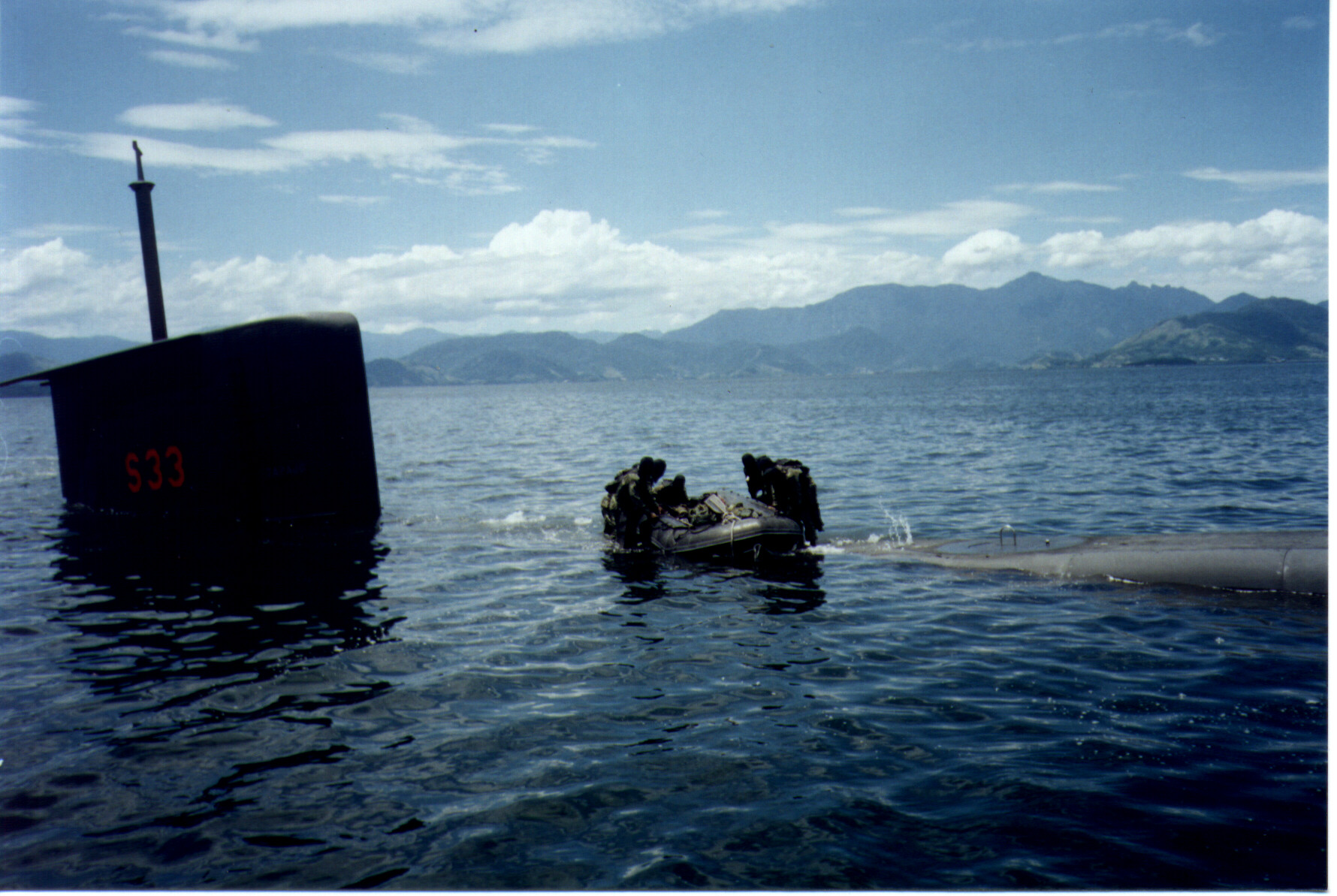
Operators deploying from Tapajó.

C-ESP-MEC is divided in three steps, named Alpha, Bravo and Charlie.

- Step Alpha (17 weeks): 13 weeks of physical training plus 4 weeks of physical training mixed with open circuit diving training.
- Step Bravo (22 weeks): 11 weeks involving physical training, hygiene and first aid and personal defense as well as theoretical courses on communications, combat techniques, demolition and armaments. In this phase, candidates begin their training on land special operations exercises, being submitted to extreme physical and psychological hardships and requiring the attributes of combat leadership, esprit de corps, objectivity, improvisation and decision-making when subjected to high risks or stress. The weather is always kept as close as possible to what would be found in a real operational situation. The other 11 weeks see the candidates being taught courses such as physical training, personal defense, combat techniques, submarine special operations, including closed circuit diving, and amphibious operations.
- Step Charlie (6 weeks): Considered an "advanced internship", this step involves training in riverine operations in the Amazon or Pantanal, and mountain warfare training in São João Del Rey. Candidates will also head to Manaus to take the Army's Jungle Survival Internship at the Centro de Instrução de Guerra na Selva (CIGS), as well as other similar courses.

One of the last tests for GRUMEC candidates involves a 16 km swim, to be taken in pairs and using sidestroke, from Ilha Grande to Angra dos Reis. The pair of swimmers, meant to motivate each other during the crossing, is the inspiration for the GRUMEC unit pin depicting two sharks.

After graduating the course, the sailor is called to serve in GRUMEC, where he has a full complement of training program and conduct advanced courses and internships in various areas such as deactivation of explosive devices (EOD), basic skydiving (static line jump), jumpmaster, HALO jump, HALO jumpmaster, precursor paratrooper (PREC), folding, maintenance and supplies by air (DOMPSA) stage basic mountaineering course in jungle operations, operational stage in the Pantanal, stage sniper (sniper), among others.

== Attributions ==
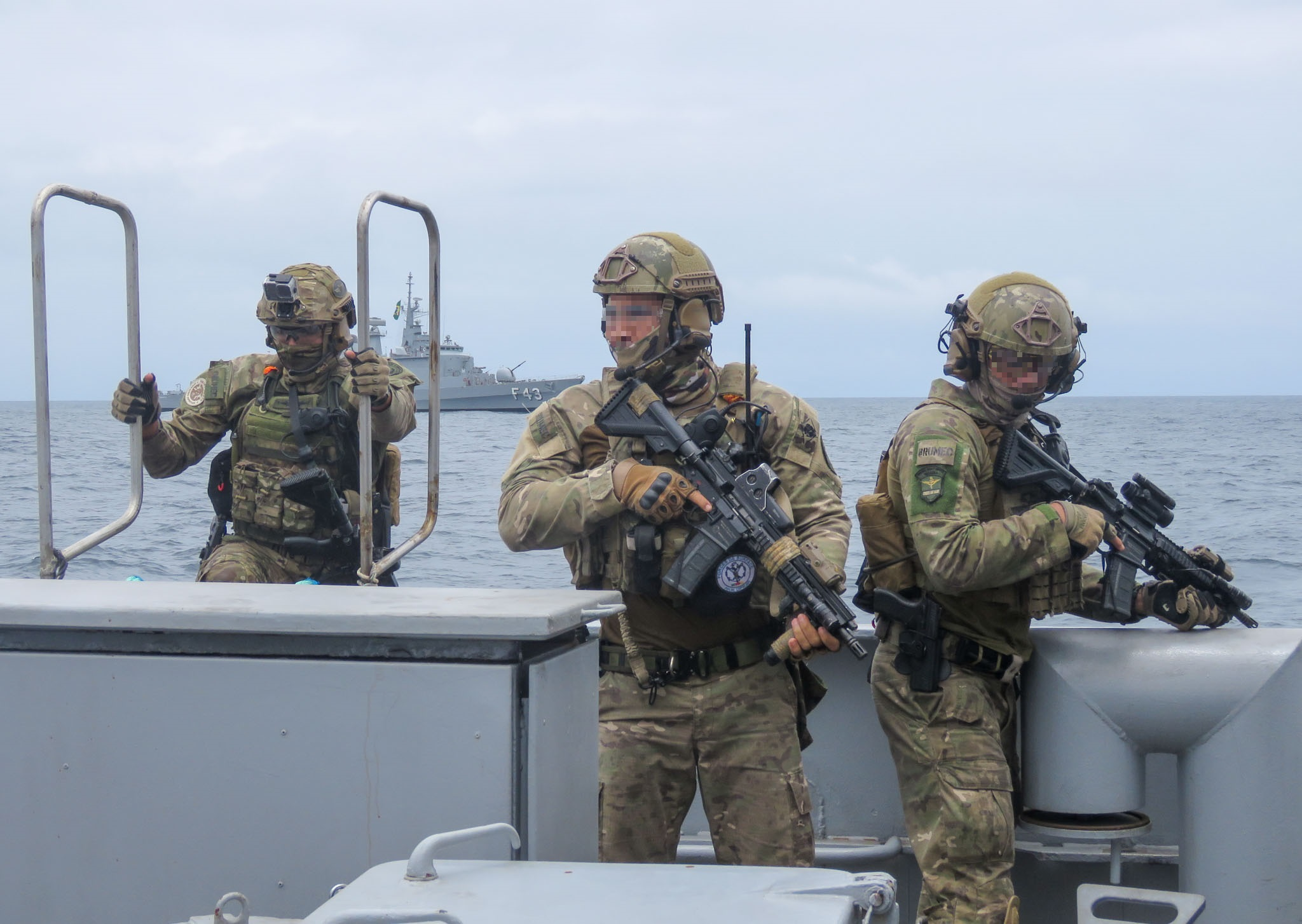
MECs conduct boarding demonstrations during Operation Guinex III.

Often operating out of the Navy's vessels, GRUMEC is present in most of the fleet's activities. Domestically, the group often takes part in training exercises that involve boarding vessels and oil platforms, as well as riverine operations in the Pantanal and Amazon. GRUMEC took part in United Nations peacekeeping operations in Haiti and Lebanon. In the Brazilian Navy's contribution to the UNIFIL Maritime Task Force, the operators were responsible for boarding potentially armed vessels entering Lebanese territorial waters and instructing the Lebanese Navy on how to perform these types of operations.

GRUMEC also instructs and contributes to the Brazilian Navy's Grupo de Visita e Inspeção (Visit and Inspection Group), responsible for inspecting vessels in the Brazilian EEZ. Since 2021, combat divers aboard ships such as Independência, União and Liberal were also tasked with training Navy and Coast Guard personnel from partner nations such as Equatorial Guinea, Ivory Coast, São Tomé e Príncipe, Cameroon, Nigeria and Cape Verde in the Gulf of Guinea as part of Brazil's effort against piracy in the region.

The group often trains alongside other frogman units from friendly countries, such as other Latin American operators or in Joint Combined Exchange Trainings (JCETs) with the U.S. Navy SEALs.

== Structure ==
Though largely classified, GRUMEC is reportedly composed of three special operations divisions, responsible for conducting activities such as special reconnaissance and direct action, and one Special Rescue and Recovery Group, designated as GERR-MEC (Grupo Especial de Retomada e Resgate - Mergulhador de Combate), responsible for high-complexity operations such as hostage rescue in environments such as ships and oil rigs.

MECs may only join GERR-MEC after having years of experience in the unit.

== See also ==
- Tonelero Battalion
