= ARA Bouchard (P-51) =

2011 Bouchard-class offshore patrol vessel

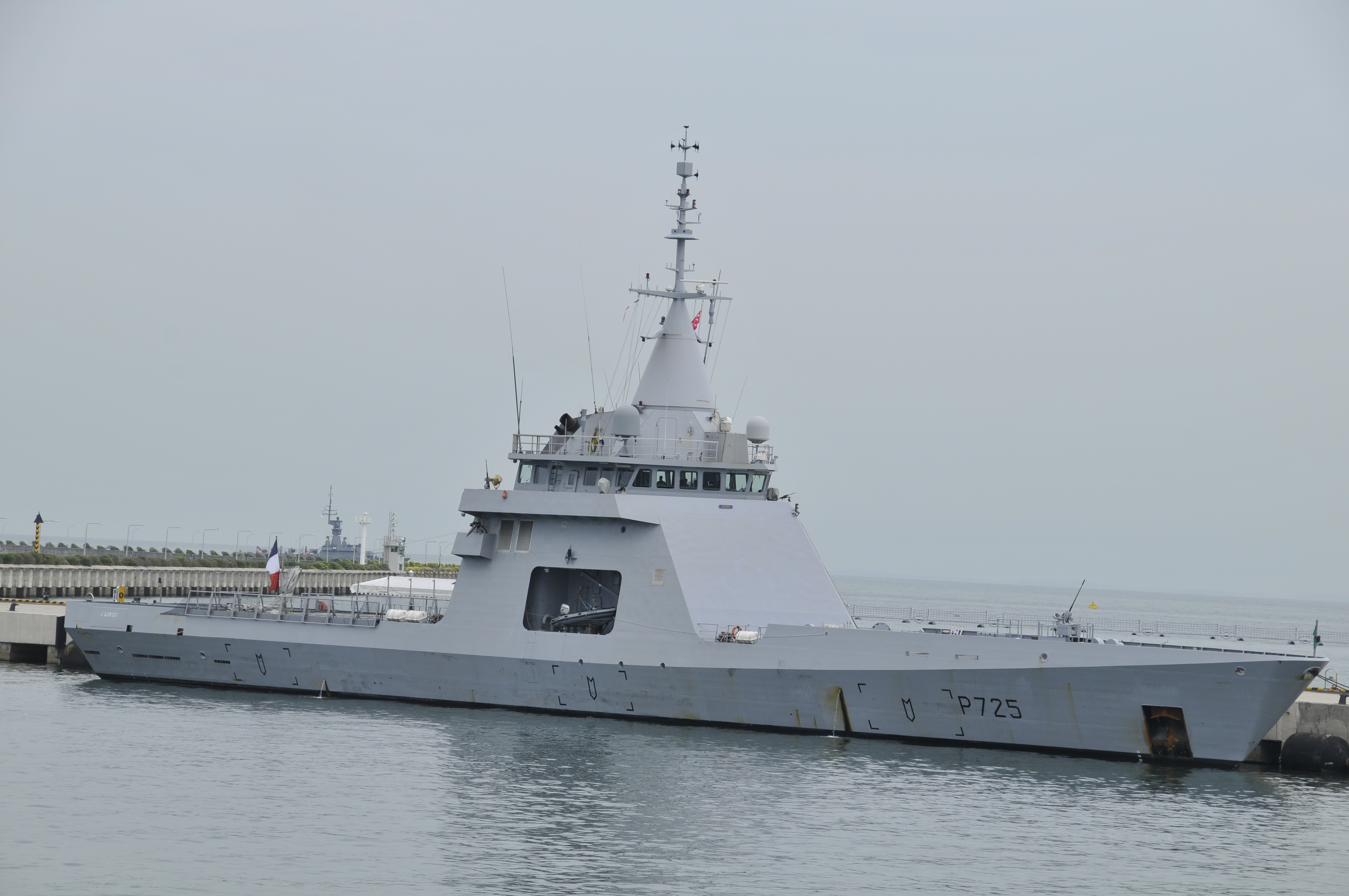
- Offshore patrol ship Adroit, future Bouchard

Class overview
- Builders: DCNS (now Kership)
- Operators: Marine Nationale; Argentine Navy
- Built: May 2010 – June 2011 (lead ship); 2019-2022 (subsequent ships)
- In commission: 2012 – present
- Planned: 4
- Completed: 4
- Active: 4

General characteristics
- Class & type: Gowind-class corvette
- Displacement: 1,450 t (1,430 long tons) (full load)
- Length: 87 m (285 ft 5 in)
- Beam: 11 m (36 ft 1 in)
- Draft: 3.3 m (10 ft 10 in)
- Installed power: Electrical:
- Propulsion: 2 Anglo Belgian Corporation V12 diesel engines, 5.6 MW (7,500 hp)
- Speed: 21 knots (39 km/h; 24 mph)
- Range: 8,000 nmi (14,800 km; 9,200 mi) at 12 knots (22 km/h; 14 mph)
- Endurance: 30 days
- Boats & landing craft carried: 2 × 9 m (30 ft) RHIBs
- Complement: 30 core crew, up to 29 troops
- Sensors & processing systems: DCNS Polaris combat management system; Terma Scanter 6002 I-Band surface search radar; Terma Scanter 4102 I-Band air and surface search radar; Sagem EOMS (Electro Optical Multisensor System) NG; Sagem SIGMA 40D Inertial measurement unit; LinkSrechts Helicopter visual landing aid system
- Electronic warfare & decoys: Thales Altesse & Vigile LW ESM/COMINT system; Lacroix Defense & Security Sylena decoy system
- Armament: 1 × 30 mm Marlin cannon (installed December 2020); 2 × .50 cal. machine guns
- Aircraft carried: 1 × 5-ton helicopter or 1 × 10-ton helicopter (supported); RUAS-160 naval drone (one UAV to be acquired by the navy; possible delivery mid-2020s; further orders may follow)
- Aviation facilities: Helicopter pad and hangar

ARA Bouchard (formerly L'Adroit) is a patrol vessel designed by the French company DCNS for maritime protection missions. She was originally part of the Gowind family of corvettes and patrol vessels but the less military members of the family like Bouchard have been moved into the Kership consortium. The design was self-funded by DCNS without an initial customer, and was initially leased to the French Navy as L'Adroit before being sold to the Argentine Navy in November 2018. The vessel was commissioned as ARA Bouchard in December 2019.

== Design ==
Bouchard has a 360° panoramic bridge and an integrated mast. The minimal superstructure of the ship leaves a substantial space available for air operations (helicopters, UAVs) and for launch and recovery of surface assets (RHIBs or USVs). Bouchard's missions are managed by a combat system, which supplies essential detailed information on the ship’s environment, acquired by various detectors, deployed sensors and other ships integrated into the surveillance network. The mission system can also include a maritime surveillance system capable of detecting suspicious course profiles automatically.

The vessel is capable of a variety of missions usually associated with offshore patrol of economic zones.

== History ==
Placed at the disposal of the French Navy by DCNS for a period of three years, L'Adroit sailed from her home base on France's Mediterranean coast in May 2012 to conduct her first fishery policing and maritime security mission, including deployment for Operation Thon Rouge, monitoring fishing vessels with red tuna quotas for 2012. She was fitted with a Camcopter S-100 rotary wing unmanned air system.

=== Argentine service ===
L'Adroit was sold to the Argentine Navy in November 2018, and was commissioned as ARA Bouchard in December 2019. She is home based at Mar del Plata naval base.

== See also ==
- ARA Piedrabuena (P-52)
