= ARA Sarandí (D-13) =

1982 Almirante Brown-class destroyer

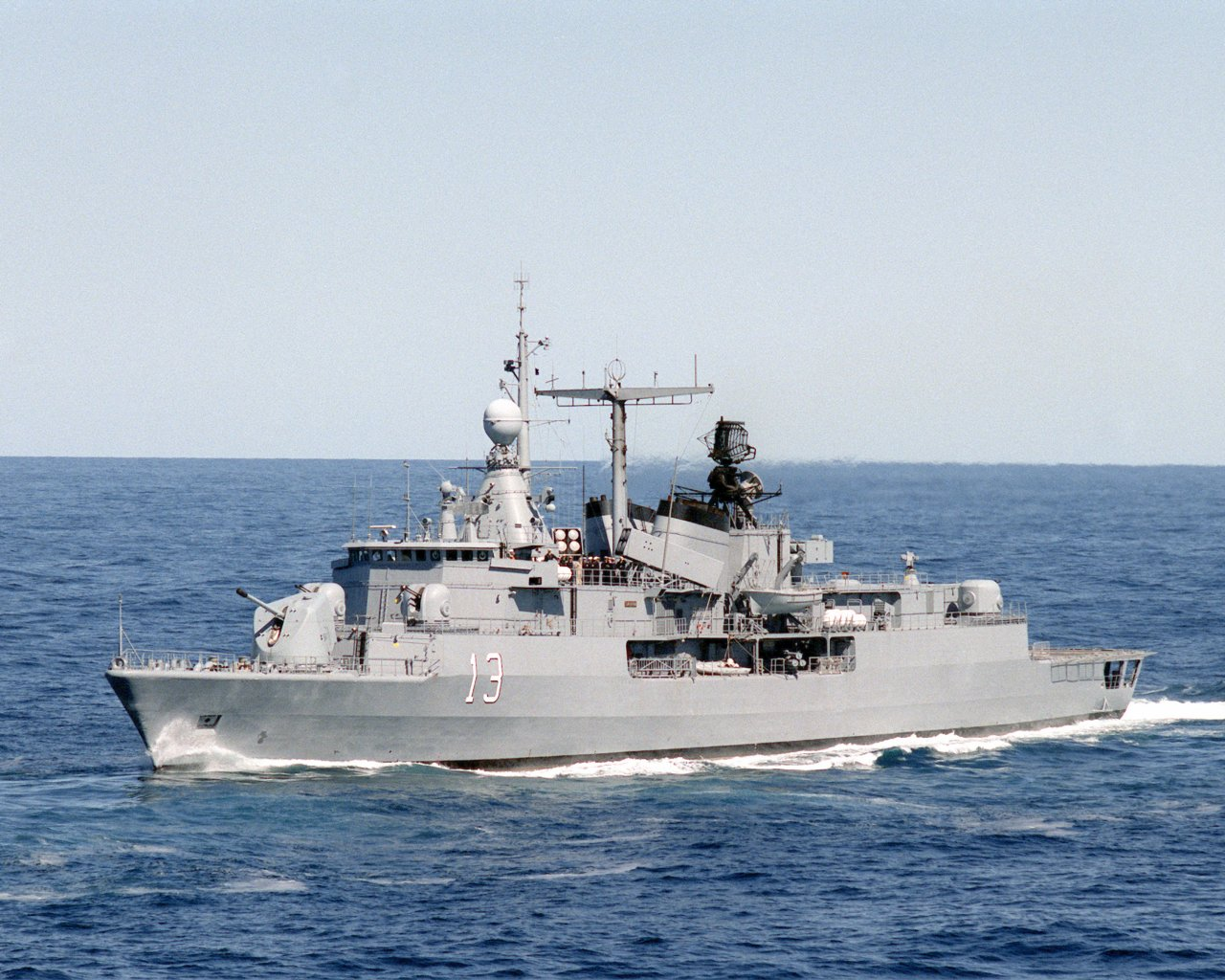
- ARA Sarandí underway

History

Argentina
- Name: Sarandí
- Builder: Blohm + Voss
- Laid down: 9 March 1982
- Launched: 31 August 1982
- Commissioned: 23 April 1984
- Identification: Pennant number D-13
- Status: in active service

General characteristics
- Class & type: Almirante Brown-class destroyer
- Displacement: 3,360 tons
- Length: 126 m (413 ft 5 in)
- Beam: 14 m (45 ft 11 in)
- Draught: 5.8 m (19 ft 0 in)
- Propulsion: COGAG (4 turbines); 36,000 shp (27,000 kW)
- Speed: 30.5 knots (56.5 km/h; 35.1 mph)
- Range: 4,500 mi (7,200 km)
- Complement: 224
- Armament: 8 × Aérospatiale MM40 Exocet anti-ship missiles; 1 × Selenia/Elsag Albatross octuple launcher with 24 Aspide SAMs; 1 × Oto Melara 127 mm (5 in) dual purpose gun; 8 × Bofors 40 mm L/70 AA guns (4 × twin); 6 × 324 mm (13 in) torpedo tubes (2 × 3)
- Aircraft carried: 1 × Aérospatiale AS 555 Fennec helicopter
- Aviation facilities: Single hangar

ARA Sarandí is the fourth and last ship of the MEKO 360H2 series of destroyers built for the Argentine Navy. The ship is also the fourth ship in the Argentine Navy to bear that name. Sarandí is the name of a victory of the Argentine army during the Cisplatine War.

The ship, along with the rest of the Argentine navy is poorly maintained and has inadequate staff training due to a lack of funding and import restrictions. In 2003, the ship fired on a friendly Brazilian warship during a joint training exercise. In 2012, the Almirante Brown class were short of spare parts and suffering engine problems, plus all their ordnance was past its expiry date.

== Origin ==
Sarandí and her sister ships were authorized under the Naval Construction National Plan of 1974, an initiative by the Argentine Navy to replace old World War II-vintage warships which were nearing the end of their operational lives. A contract was signed with the Blohm + Voss Shipyards in Hamburg, West Germany for the construction of four MEKO 360H2 destroyers.

== Construction ==
Sarandí's keel was laid down on 9 March 1982 and she was launched on 31 August 1982. The ship was delivered to the Argentine Navy on 23 April 1984 for her sea trials, following which she departed for Argentina, arriving at Puerto Belgrano Naval Base on 21 June 1984.

== Service history ==
In 2003, Sarandi joined the USS Enterprise carrier strike group and Destroyer Squadron 18 as a part of the military exercise Solid Step during their tour in the Mediterranean. This marked the first time that a ship of the Argentine Navy inter-operated with a United States Navy battlegroup.

Sarandí was involved in an incident on 29 November 2004, during the annual FRATERNO naval exercise, with ships of the Brazilian Navy. While conducting gunnery practice shots against target drones, a technical failure of her automatic weapons system made her fire on the Brazilian frigate Rademaker, injuring four Brazilian crewmen and an Argentine naval observer, as well as moderate damage to the Brazilian ship.

As of 2021 she was based at Puerto Belgrano as the flagship of the Navy's 2nd Destroyer Division, along with her three sister ships. In September of that year, she participated in a naval exercise also involving the corvettes Espora, Robinson, Gómez Roca and Spiro. In 2022, she again participated in an exercise off the coast of Mar del Plata with Espora, Robinson, the corvette Rosales and the transport ship Canal Beagle.

In 2023, the destroyer, accompanied by the patrol vessel Bartolomé Cordero and supported by an S2T-Turbo Tracker aircraft, conducted joint exercises with the frigates Independência and União and the submarine Tikuna of the Brazilian Navy.

In May 2024 Sarandí, in conjunction with her sister ship La Argentina and the corvettes Espora and Rosales, as well as the offshore patrol vessels Bartolomé Cordero, Piedrabuena and Almirante Storni, was tasked to participate in joint exercises with the US Navy's George Washington carrier task group. The exercises were the first to take place between the two navies in several years.

In August 2024, she took part in joint exercise Fraterno XXXVII in the South Atlantic along with the offshore patrol vessel Almirante Storni and corvette Espora, as well as the Brazilian Navy's frigate Liberal and submarine Tikuna. The exercise's anti-submarine warfare element focused on reconnaissance, sonar tracking, search and attack by surface units, whereas the maritime element focused on joint air defense coordination, tactical formations and joint helicopter maneuvers. After Fraterno's conclusion, Sarandí and Liberal headed towards Valparaíso for UNITAS LXV. The two ships met and performed exercises with the Chilean frigate Almirante Lynch on the way.
