= Brazilian frigate União =

Niterói-class Frigates

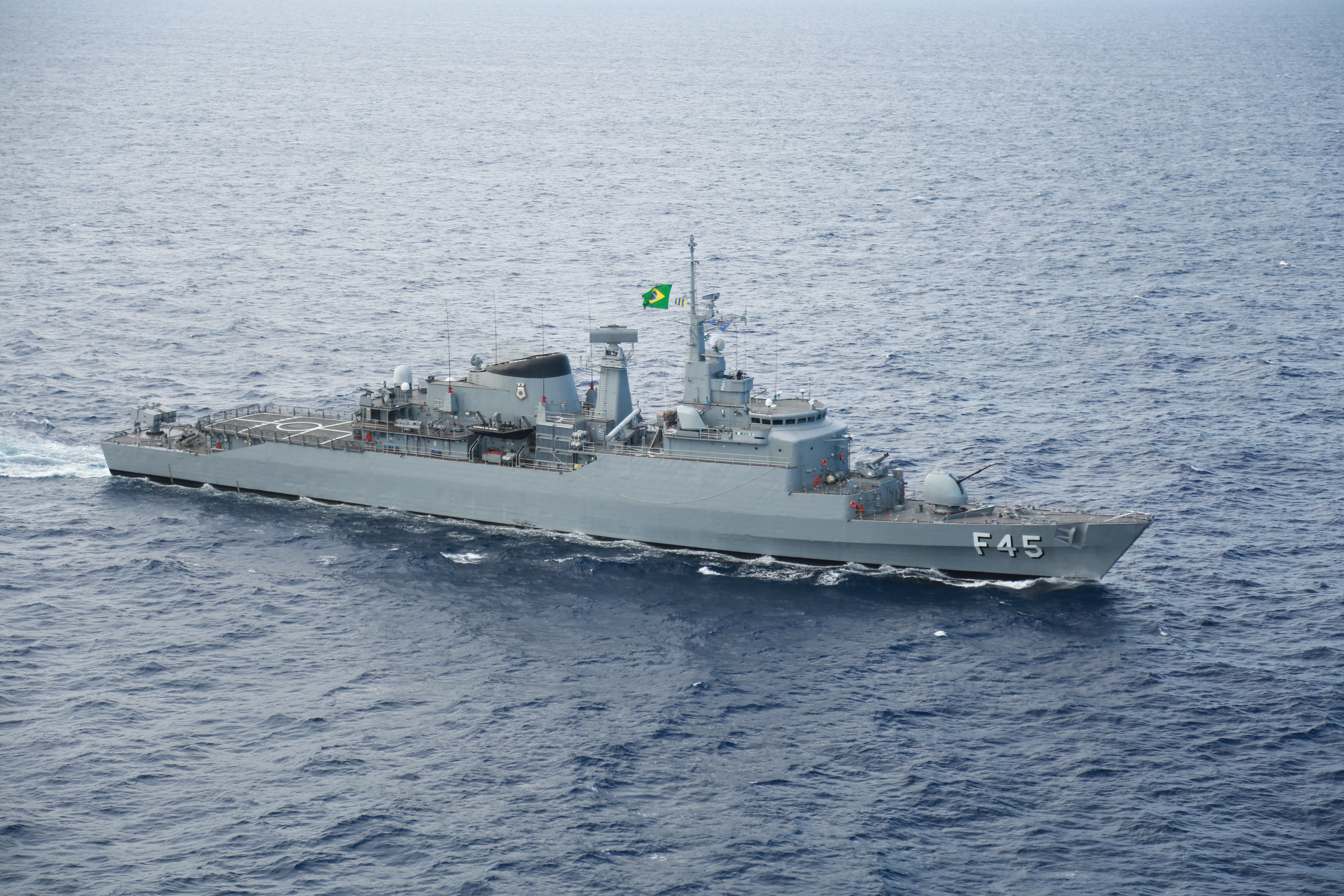
- União

History

Brazil
- Name: União
- Namesake: União
- Builder: Arsenal de Marinha do Rio de Janeiro
- Launched: 14 March 1975
- Christened: 11 June 1972
- Commissioned: 12 September 1980
- Home port: Rio de Janeiro
- Identification: MMSI number: 710467000; Callsign: PWUN; Pennant number: F-45
- Status: Active

General characteristics
- Class & type: Niterói-class frigate
- Displacement: 3.355 t (3.302 long tons)
- Length: 129.2 m (423 ft 11 in)
- Beam: 13.5 m (44 ft 3 in)
- Draught: 5.5 m (18 ft 1 in)
- Propulsion: CODOG, two shafts; 2 × Rolls-Royce Olympus TM-3B gas turbines 42,000 kW (56,000 hp) combined; 4 × MTU 16V 956 TB91 diesel engines 13,000 kW (17,000 hp) combined
- Speed: 30 knots (56 km/h; 35 mph) (maximum); 22 knots (41 km/h; 25 mph) (diesels only)
- Range: 5,300 nmi (9,800 km; 6,100 mi)
- Endurance: 45 days
- Complement: 217
- Sensors & processing systems: Modernized: Alenia RAN-20S air search radar; Terma Scanter surface search radar; Orion RTN-30X fire control radar; Saab EOS-400 optronic director; Krupp Atlas EDO-610E hull mounted sonar; SICONTA Mk 2 C3I system
- Electronic warfare & decoys: Modernized: Cutlass B1W ESM; ET/SQL-1 ECM; 12 × 102 mm decoy launchers
- Armament: Modernized: 1 × Albatros launcher for 8 Aspide surface-to-air missiles; 1 × 114 mm Mark 8 gun; 2 × Bofors 40 mm guns; 2 × twin launchers for Exocet anti-ship missiles; 2 × triple torpedo tubes for Mark 46 torpedoes; 1 × double-barrel Bofors Boroc anti-submarine rockets
- Aircraft carried: Westland Super Lynx Mk.21B helicopter
- Aviation facilities: Helipad and hangar

União (F45) is a Niterói-class frigate of the Brazilian Navy. The União was the sixth ship of her class ordered by the Brazilian Navy, on 20 September 1970. The União was launched on 14 March 1975, and was commissioned on 12 September 1980.

== History ==
In 2003, União underwent the modernization process, which provided the vessel with an increase in its operating life. At the time, weapons and submarine detection systems were replaced by state-of-the-art equipment, in view of the obsolescence of the original equipment.

From 14 November 2011 to 14 May 2012, União was the flagship of UNIFIL's Maritime Task Force, leading three ships from Germany, two from Bangladesh, one Greek, one Turkish and one from Indonesia. She was replaced by Liberal, who arrived at Lebanon on 17 May 2012.

She had her second tenure as flagship of the UNIFIL MTF in 2013, arriving at Beirut in 11 July to relieve Constituição and remaining until 17 January 2014, when she was relieved by Liberal.

From 18 June to 20 August 2022, União performed Operation "Guinex II", which saw her patrol the waters around the Gulf of Guinea and visit several Western African countries such as the Ivory Coast, São Tomé e Príncipe, Cameroon, Nigeria and Cape Verde, helping train local forces in boarding and anti-piracy operations.

In 2023, the frigate, accompanied by her sister ship Independência and the submarine Tikuna, conducted joint exercises with the destroyer Sarandí and the offshore patrol vessel Bartolomé Cordero of the Argentine Navy.
