= Brazilian frigate Independência =

Niterói-class Frigates

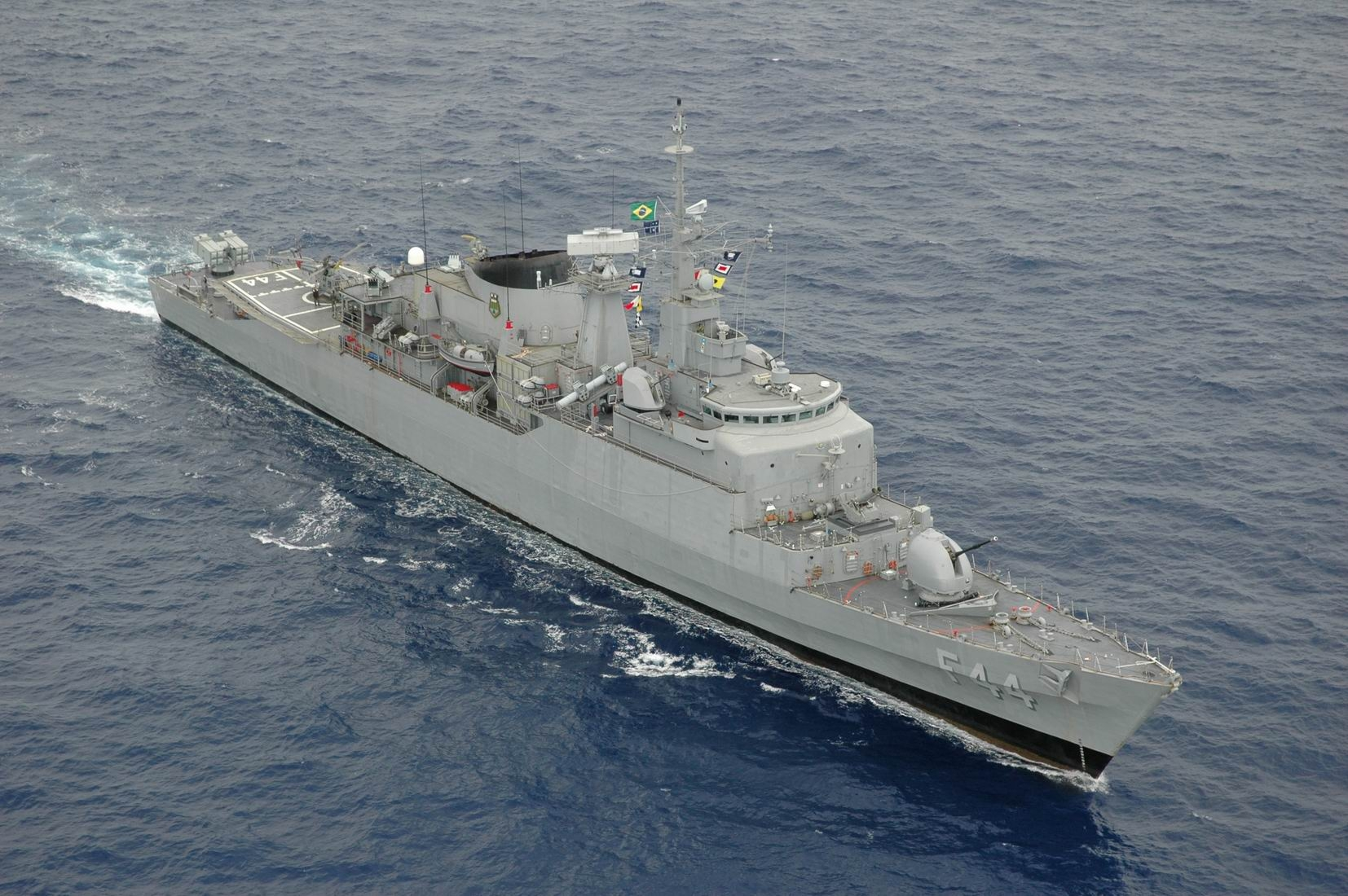
- Independência

History

Brazil
- Name: Independência
- Namesake: Independência
- Builder: Arsenal de Marinha do Rio de Janeiro
- Launched: 2 September 1974
- Christened: 11 June 1972
- Commissioned: 3 September 1979
- Home port: Rio de Janeiro
- Identification: MMSI number: 710466000; Callsign: PWIN; Pennant number: F-44
- Motto: A Independência de todos depende de cada um de nós English: "Everyone's Independence depends on each one of us"
- Nickname(s): Léo Pirata
- Status: Active

General characteristics
- Class & type: Niterói-class frigate
- Displacement: 3.355 t (3.302 long tons)
- Length: 129.2 m (423 ft 11 in)
- Beam: 13.5 m (44 ft 3 in)
- Draught: 5.5 m (18 ft 1 in)
- Propulsion: CODOG, two shafts; 2 × Rolls-Royce Olympus TM-3B gas turbines 42,000 kW (56,000 hp) combined; 4 × MTU 16V 956 TB91 diesel engines 13,000 kW (17,000 hp) combined
- Speed: 30 knots (56 km/h; 35 mph) (maximum); 22 knots (41 km/h; 25 mph) (diesels only)
- Range: 5,300 nmi (9,800 km; 6,100 mi)
- Endurance: 45 days
- Complement: 217
- Sensors & processing systems: Modernized: Alenia RAN-20S air search radar; Terma Scanter surface search radar; Orion RTN-30X fire control radar; Saab EOS-400 optronic director; Krupp Atlas EDO-610E hull mounted sonar; SICONTA Mk 2 C3I system
- Electronic warfare & decoys: Modernized: Cutlass B1W ESM; ET/SQL-1 ECM; 12 × 102 mm decoy launchers
- Armament: Modernized: 1 × Albatros launcher for 8 Aspide surface-to-air missiles; 1 × 114 mm Mark 8 gun; 2 × Bofors 40 mm guns; 2 × twin launchers for Exocet anti-ship missiles; 2 × triple torpedo tubes for Mark 46 torpedoes; 1 × double-barrel Bofors Boroc anti-submarine rockets
- Aircraft carried: Westland Super Lynx Mk.21B helicopter
- Aviation facilities: Helipad and hangar

Independência (F44) is a Niterói-class frigate of the Brazilian Navy. The Independência was the fifth ship of her class ordered by the Brazilian Navy, on 20 September 1970. The Independência was launched on 2 September 1974, and was commissioned on 3 September 1979.

== History ==
The Independência took over command of the Maritime Task Force of the United Nations Interim Force in Lebanon (FTM-UNIFIL) on 28 January 2018, to carry out Operation Lebanon XIII from March to September 2018. The ship captained the FTM-UNIFIL, whose mission is to prevent entry into Lebanese territory, illegal arms and smuggling, as well as providing support for the development of the Lebanese Navy, in terms of training its personnel, in order to make it capable of controlling its territorial waters in the future.

From August to October 2021, she sailed to the Gulf of Guinea in Operation "Guinex-I", which sought to improve joint maritime security capabilities of Brazil with partner African nations situated in the Gulf. Over the course of the operation, Independência visited Equatorial Guinea, São Tomé e Príncipe, Cameroon, Nigeria and Cape Verde, where GRUMEC operators took part in training local forces in anti-piracy and boarding operations.

In 2023, the frigate, accompanied by the frigate União and the submarine Tikuna, conducted joint exercises with the destroyer ARA Sarandí and the offshore patrol vessel ARA Bartolomé Cordero of the Argentine Navy.
