= Kership-class patrol vessel =

Class of offshore patrol vessels

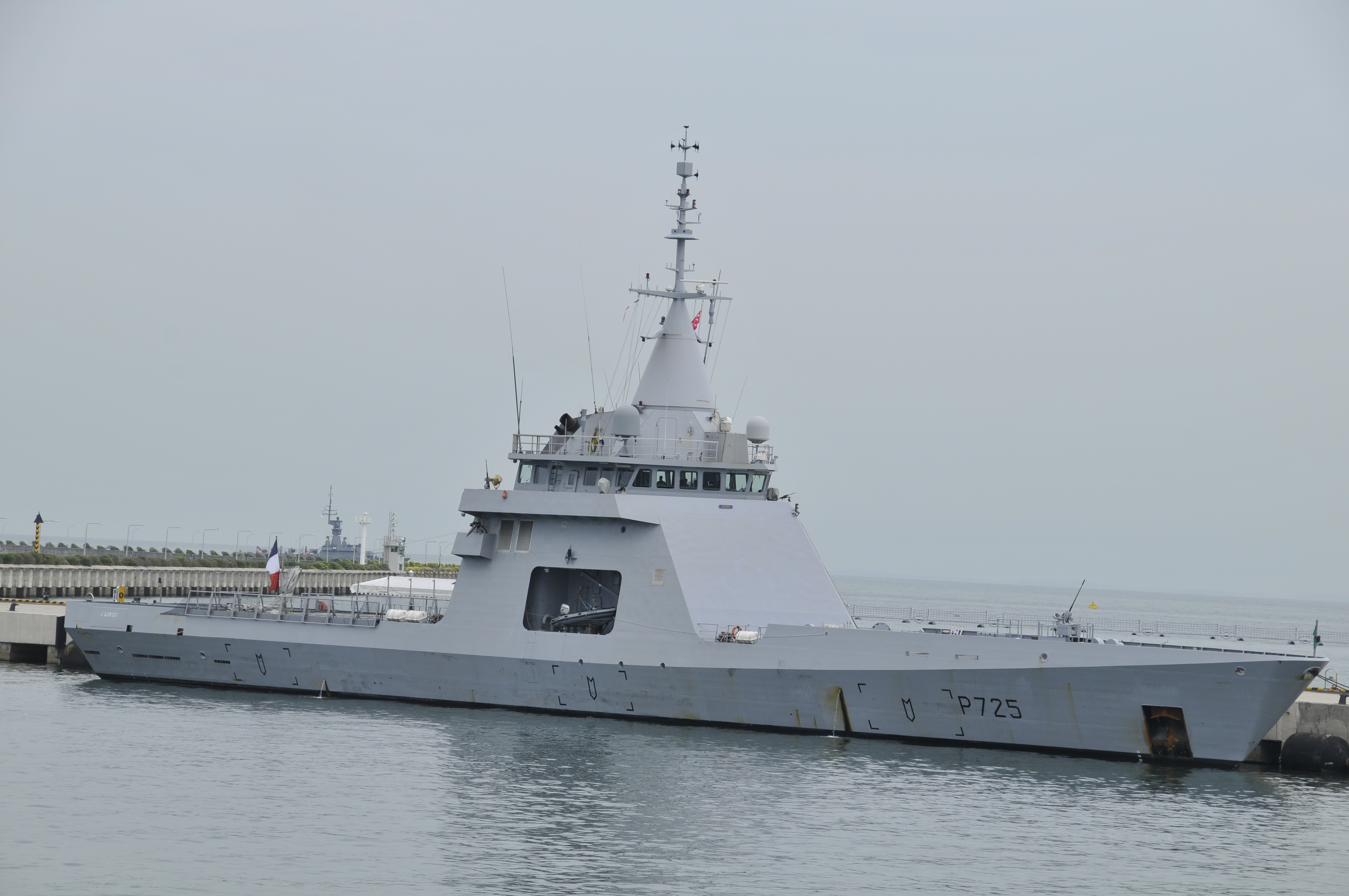
- French Offshore Patrol Ship L'Adroit

Class overview
- Name: Kership
- Builders: Piriou Shipyard
- Operators: French Navy (1 - former); Gabonese Navy (2 -deferred); Argentine Navy (4)
- Preceded by: Gowind-class corvette
- Planned: 4
- Completed: 4
- Active: 4

General characteristics
- Class & type: Kership (L'Adroit specifications)
- Displacement: 1,650 t (1,650 t) (full load)
- Length: 87 m (285 ft)
- Beam: 11 m (36 ft)
- Draught: 3.3 m (11 ft)
- Installed power: Electrical:
- Propulsion: 2 Anglo Belgian Corporation V12 diesel engines, 5.6 MW (7,500 hp)
- Speed: 21 knots (39 km/h; 24 mph)
- Range: 8,000 nmi (14,800 km; 9,200 mi) at 12 knots (22 km/h; 14 mph)
- Endurance: 30 days
- Boats & landing craft carried: 2 × 9 m (30 ft) RHIBs
- Complement: 30 core crew, up to 29 troops
- Sensors & processing systems: DCNS Polaris combat management system; Terma Scanter 6002 I-Band surface search radar; Terma Scanter 4102 I-Band air and surface search radar; Sagem EOMS (Electro Optical Multisensor System) NG; Sagem SIGMA 40D Inertial measurement unit; LinkSrechts Helicopter visual landing aid system
- Electronic warfare & decoys: Thales Altesse & Vigile LW ESM/COMINT system; Lacroix Defense & Security Sylena decoy system
- Armament: 1 × 30 mm cannon; 2 × .50-cal machine guns
- Aircraft carried: 1 × 5-tons helicopter or 1 × 10-tons helicopter (supported); Schiebel Camcopter S-100 (not acquired by Argentina)
- Aviation facilities: helicopter pad and hangar

The Kership class is a range of steel monohull offshore patrol vessels (OPVs) built by Kership, a joint venture of French civil shipbuilder Piriou (55%) and Naval shipbuilder DCNS (45%).

== History ==
The ships were originally part of the Gowind class but after a rearrangement of products DCNS decided to remove the OPV from the Gowind class and develop the OPVs as a class of their own with L'Adroit top of the range. To do so it formed the Kership joint venture with the Piriou shipyard in Concarneau, Brittany in May 2013 to build and market lightly armed and armoured OPVs for customs, fishing and other home security missions. DCNS said this would enable it to concentrate on "developing relations" with clients seeking, heavily armed and armoured warships while Kership handles the more civilian-standard OPVs.

After repeated negotiations and break-offs, in February 2018 the Argentine Navy was instructed to restart negotiations with Naval Group for the procurement of four Gowind-class vessels. The decision was motivated by the meeting between Argentine President Mauricio Macri and French President Emmanuel Macron at the annual World Economic Forum summit in Davos, Switzerland. An order for four vessels was expected in July 2018. In November 2018, Argentina confirmed the purchase of four Gowind-class vessels. The purchase includes the already-built L'Adroit, which in 2016 visited the region on a marketing trip, and three new vessels. Four ships, one being transferred from the French Navy, entered service between 2019 and 2022.

== Vessels ==
=== Argentina (incl. one former French vessel) ===
On 9 May 2010, DCNS started the building of one self-funded 1,410t Gowind patrol corvette called L'Adroit and announced that the craft will be made available to the French Navy between 2012 and 2015. The vessel is designed for patrol and sovereignty enforcement in littoral and exclusive economic zone waters and offers three weeks' endurance and a range of 8,000 nautical miles (15,000 km; 9,200 mi). Missions include special forces deployment by launching within 5 minutes and recovering two UFAST UFR 9.30 rigid-hulled inflatable boats from a stern ramp. It was sold to Argentina in 2018 and commissioned as ARA Bouchard. Three additional vessels were then acquired under a new construction contract with France.

=== Gabon ===
On 29 October 2014, Ernest Mphouho Epigat, defence minister for the Gabonese Republic signed a contract with Piriou to supply two offshore patrol vessels to the Gabonese Navy. One was to be of the Kership design. The unnamed vessel was called OPV50 by Piriou. However, the purchase was reportedly deferred in 2016.

==== Specifications ====
- Length overall 58.20 m
- Beam 9.50 m
- Draught 2.70 m
- Speed 21 kn
- Range 5,000 NM at 12 kn
- Hull / superstructure steel / aluminium
- Accommodation capacity 36 pers.

– crew 28 pers. – special personnel 8 pers.

- Weaponry

– 1 x 20 mm gun on the fore-deck – 2 x 12.7 mm machine guns
