= Brazilian submarine Tikuna =

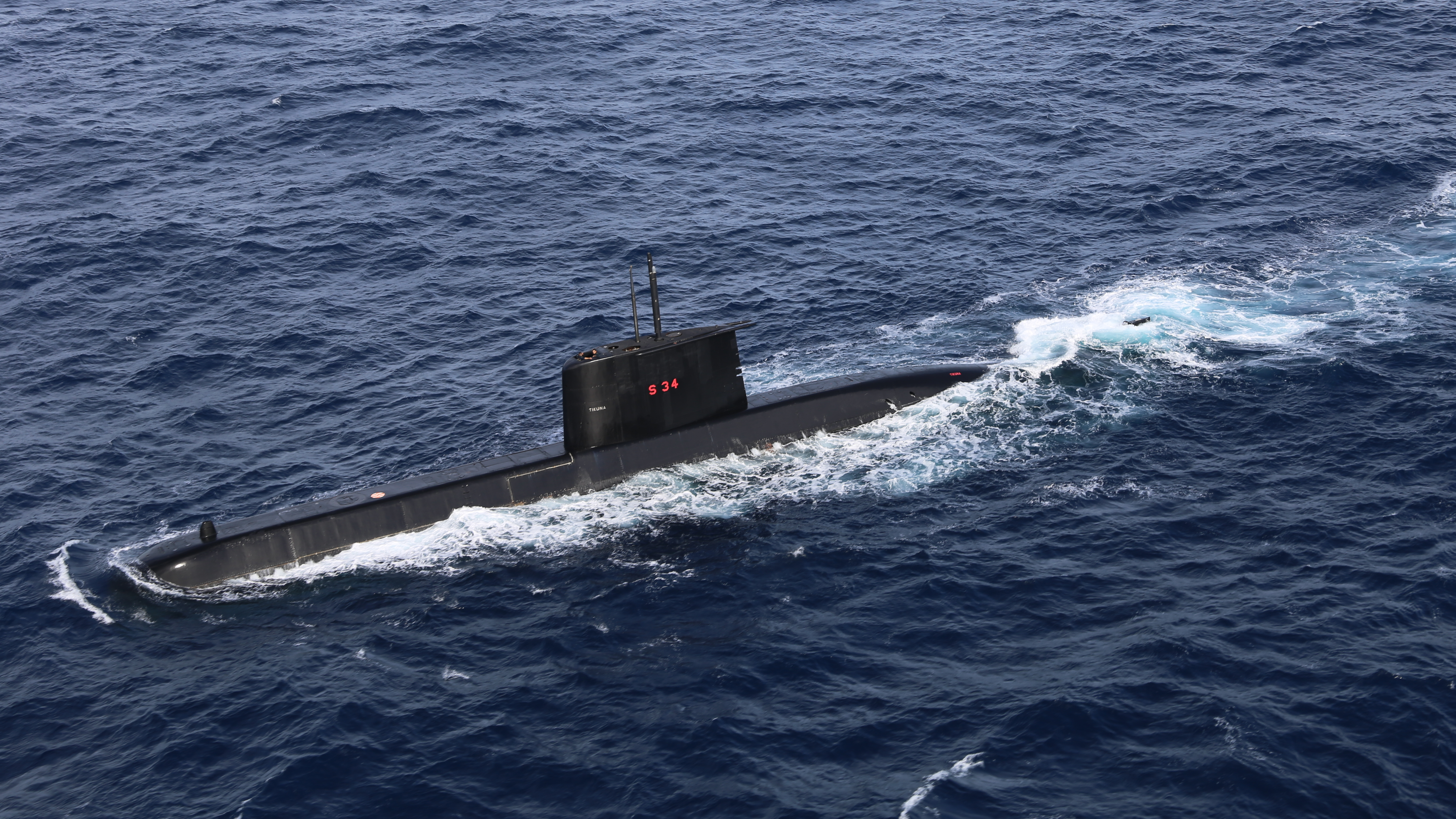
- Tikuna

History

Brazil
- Name: Tikuna
- Builder: Arsenal de Marinha do Rio de Janeiro
- Launched: 9 March 2005
- In service: 16 December 2005
- Status: In service

General characteristics
- Class & type: Tupi-class submarine
- Armament: 8 × 533 mm (21.0 in) U209TT launch torpedo tubes, ATK Alliant Techsystems Mk.48 ADCAP torpedoes.

Tikuna (S34) is a Type 209 submarine of the Brazilian Navy. Built in the Brazilian Navy Yard in Rio de Janeiro (AMRJ), it was launched in March 2005 and incorporated into the Brazilian Navy on July 21, 2006, and then transferred to the Naval Operations Command. It is the fourth Brazilian Navy submarine made in Brazil and the largest ever built in the country. The name of this submarine is a tribute to South American indigenous tribe Tikuna inhabiting the region of the Upper Solimões, in the western part of the State of Amazonas.

== History ==
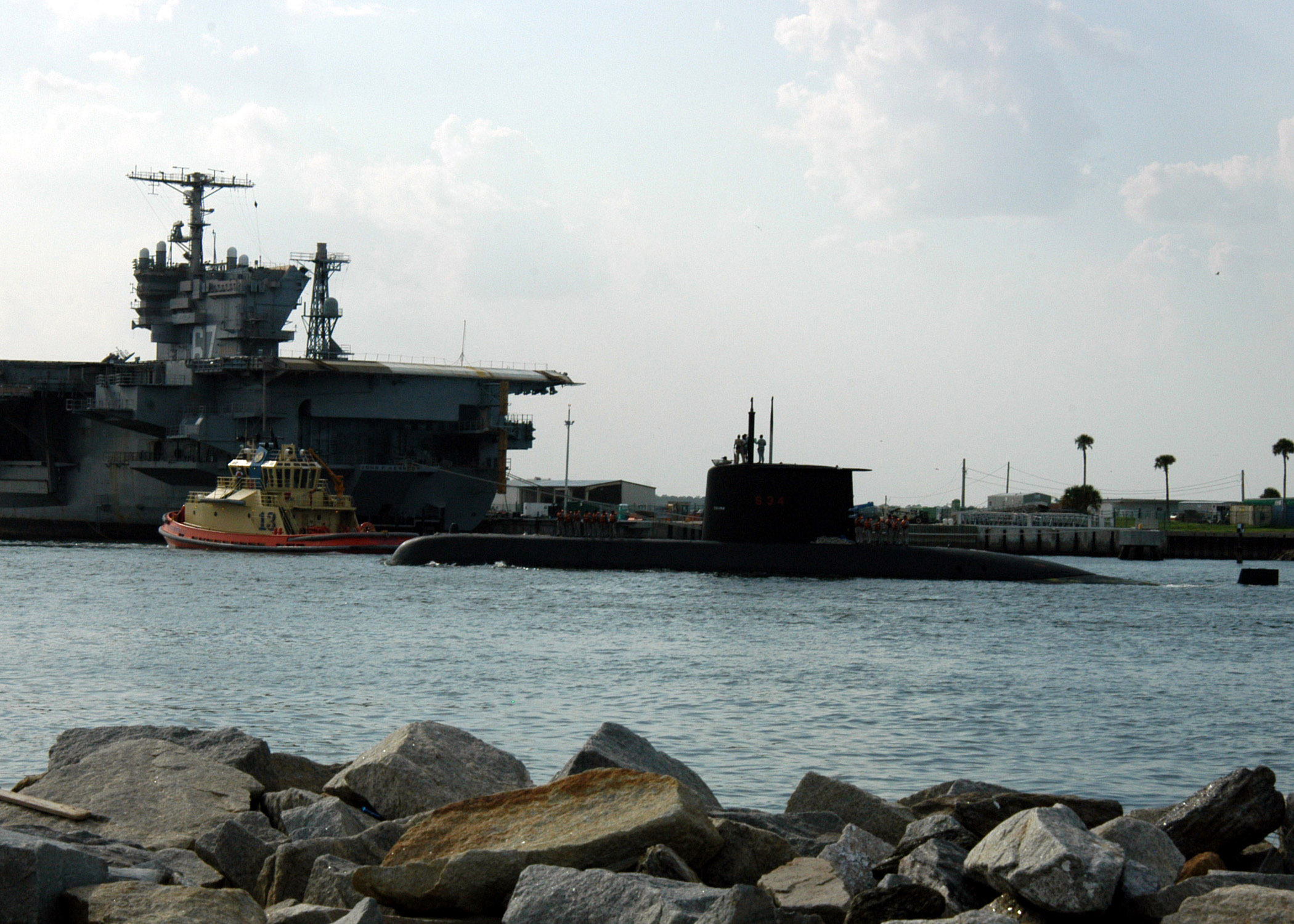
Tikuna arriving at the U.S. naval base in Mayport, Florida with the aircraft carrier USS John F. Kennedy

The submarine was built in the Brazilian Navy Yard in Rio de Janeiro and was put out to sea at 10:30 of 9 March 2005. She was incorporated into the Navy on 16 December 2005, and then transferred to the Naval Operations Command. On 21 July 2006, she was transferred from the Department of Material for the Naval Operations Command, in a ceremony held at the Navy Yard in Rio de Janeiro.

The Tikuna is the fourth Brazilian Navy submarine built into the strategy of learning how to "Design, Construction and Repair" these resources and the largest submarine ever built by the country. She has a crew of seven officers and 29 enlisted, eight torpedo tubes and is powered by diesel-electric propulsion, with electric motor, batteries and sets of diesel-engine generators.

The submarine was active as of 2023 and in that year, accompanied by the frigates União and Independência, conducted joint exercises with the destroyer ARA Sarandí and the offshore patrol vessel ARA Bartolomé Cordero of the Argentine Navy.

== Design ==
Her design is based on that of the German IKL-209 design which originated the Tupi class in Brazil. The Tikuna incorporates several technological innovations that provide better performance such as lower noise signature and longer period of submerged operation, particularly during battery recharge operations (snorkel) while the vessel is snorkeling. These substantial innovations make this submarine the first in a new class bearing her name.
