= ARA Espora (P-41) =

Espora-class corvette of the Argentine Navy

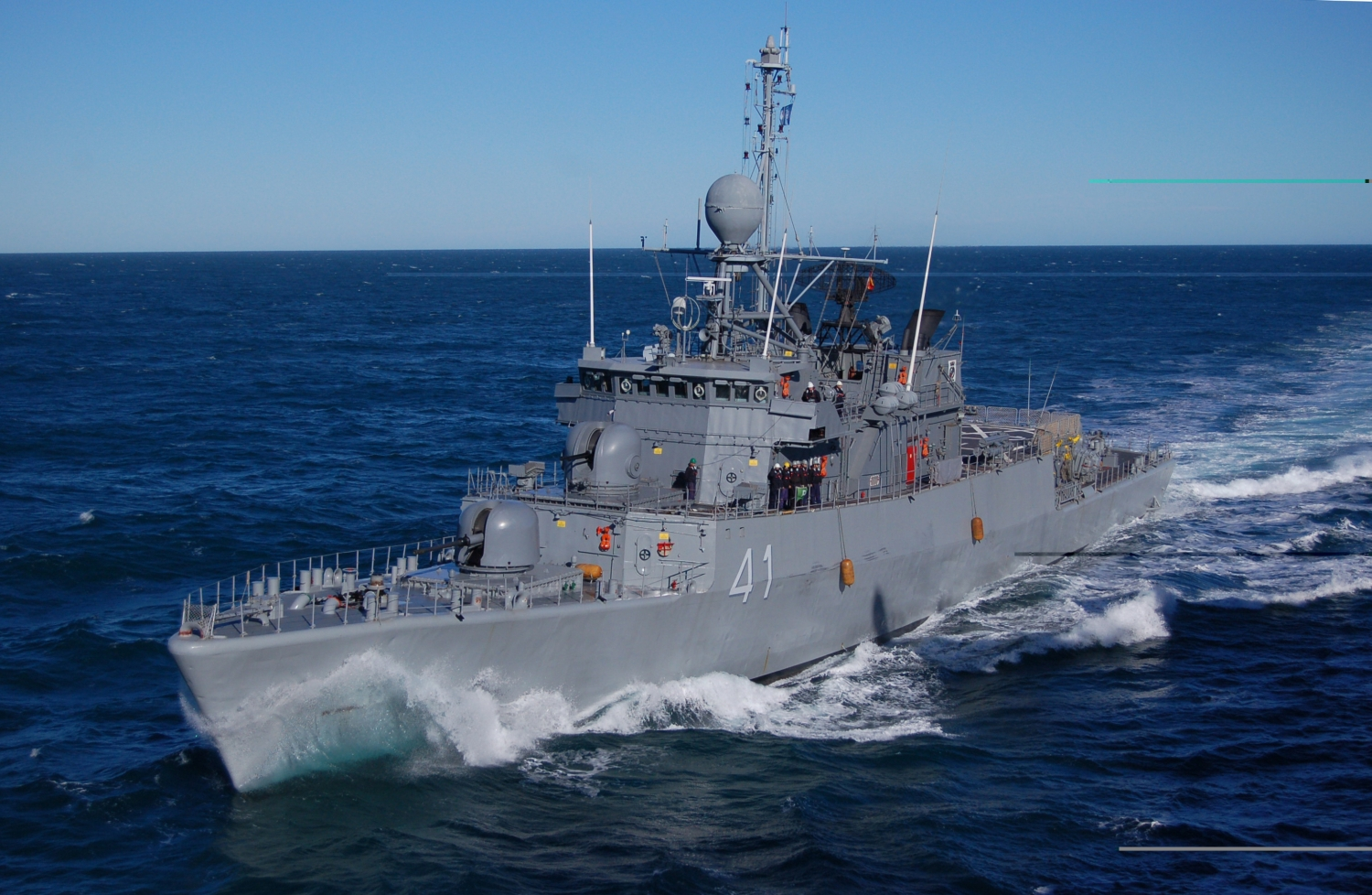
- ARA Espora

History

Argentina
- Name: Espora
- Namesake: Tomás Espora
- Builder: Río Santiago Shipyard
- Laid down: 10 March 1980
- Launched: 23 January 1982
- Acquired: 5 July 1985
- Commissioned: 4 September 1985
- Home port: Puerto Belgrano
- Status: Active

General characteristics
- Class & type: MEKO 140A16 Espora-class corvette
- Displacement: 1,560 tons (1,790 tons full load)
- Length: 91.2 m (299 ft 3 in)
- Beam: 11.0 m (36 ft 1 in)
- Draught: 3.33 m (10 ft 11 in) (hull)
- Installed power: 22,600 bhp (16.9 MW)
- Propulsion: 2 × SEMT Pielstick 16 PC 2-5 V400 diesels, 2 × 5-blade props
- Speed: 27 knots (50 km/h; 31 mph)
- Range: 4,000 nmi (7,400 km; 4,600 mi) at 18 knots (33 km/h; 21 mph)
- Complement: 11 officers, 46 petty officers, 36 enlisted
- Sensors & processing systems: Thales DA-05/2 air/surface search; Thales WM-28, LIROD fire control; Decca TM 1226 navigation; Atlas AQS-1 hull MF sonar
- Electronic warfare & decoys: Decca RDC-2ABC; Decca RCM-2 jammer; 2 × Matra Dagaie decoys
- Armament: 4 × MM38 Exocet anti-ship missiles; 1 × 76 mm/62 OTO Melara dual purpose gun; 2 × DARDO twin 40 mm AA guns; 2 × .50 cal machine guns; 2 × triple 324 mm ILAS-3 tubes (WASS A-244S torpedoes)
- Aircraft carried: Eurocopter Fennec
- Aviation facilities: Helipad

ARA Espora (P-41) is the lead ship of the MEKO 140A16 Espora class of six corvettes built for the Argentine Navy. Commissioned in 1985, she is used for fishery patrol. She is homeported at Puerto Belgrano Naval Base and is part of the Navy's 2nd Corvette Division with her five sister ships. The ship is the sixth ship to bear the name of Colonel (Navy) Tomás Espora, who fought in the Argentine Navy during the Cisplatine War. Generator failure left her stranded in South Africa for 73 days in late 2012.

== Construction ==
Espora and her sister ships were part of the 1974 Naval Constructions National Plan, an initiative by the Argentine Navy to replace old World War II-vintage ships with more advanced warships. The original plan called for six MEKO 360H2 destroyers, four of them to be built in Argentina, but the plan was later modified to include four MEKO destroyers and six corvettes for anti-surface warfare and patrol operations.

Espora was built at the Río Santiago Shipyard of the Astilleros y Fábricas Navales del Estado (State Shipyards and Naval Factories) state corporation. She was launched on 23 January 1982, and officially delivered to the Navy on 5 July 1985. She was commissioned on 4 September 1985.

== Service history ==
Following her commissioning Espora participated in several naval exercises and conducted fishery patrol duties in the Argentine exclusive economic zone, capturing four illegal fishing ships between 1991 and 1994.

In August 2012 Espora left Puerto Belgrano to take part in the Atlasur IX naval exercise with South Africa, Brazil and Uruguay off West Africa. This deployment was necessary after the original participant from Argentina, ARA Spiro, had run aground as she left port. After completing Atlasur, Espora headed for South Africa and docked at Simonstown. The intention was to join the IBSAMAR III exercise with India, Brazil and South Africa, but Espora had made the unscheduled deployment with malfunctioning generators and these had got worse en route until they finally stopped working on 9 October. The generators needed a major overhaul, but their German manufacturer MTU refused to start work until they were paid US$450,000 to cover the cost of the work and previous invoices that had not been paid. Meanwhile, the South Africans had to reassure the Argentines that Espora would not be vulnerable like the sail training ship ARA Libertad, which was seized in Ghana on behalf of holders of Argentina's defaulted sovereign debt. Espora finally sailed after 73 days in Simonstown, refuelled in Rio de Janeiro on 4 January and arrived back in Puerto Belgrano on 10 January 2013.

On 31 May 2016, Espora collided with the Marshall Islands-flagged tanker Saturn off Puerto Belgrano. Both vessels were severely damaged.

In 2021, Espora was reported active and, in September, participated in a sea exercise also involving her sister ships Spiro, Robinson and Gómez Roca, along with the destroyer Sarandí. In 2022, she again participated in an exercise off the coast of Mar del Plata with Sarandí, Robinson, the corvette Rosales and the transport ship Canal Beagle.

In 2024 the corvette, together with the offshore patrol vessel , was tasked with carrying-out patrol missions to monitor Argentina's 200-nautical mile exclusive economic zone. For her patrol mission, Espora embarked a Eurocopter Fennec helicopter from the 1st naval helicopter squadron. In May, Espora, in conjunction with her sister ship Rosales and the destroyers La Argentina and Sarandí, as well as the offshore patrol vessels Bartolomé Cordero, Piedrabuena and Almirante Storni, was tasked to participate in joint exercises with the US Navy's George Washington carrier task group. The exercises were the first to take place between the two navies in several years. In August 2024, Espora, her sister ship Rosales, as well as the destroyers Sarandí and La Argentina, engaged in joint exercises with the Brazilian Navy.
