= Anglo Belgian Corporation =

Belgian engine manufacturer

Anglo Belgian Corporation (A.B.C.)
- Type: Naamloze vennootschap (NV); Société anonyme (SA)
- Predecessor: Anglo Belgian Company (1912–1979)
- Founded: 1912
- Headquarters: Ghent, Belgium
- Products: Medium speed diesel engines
- Parent: OGEPAR s.a.
- Website: www.abc-engines.com

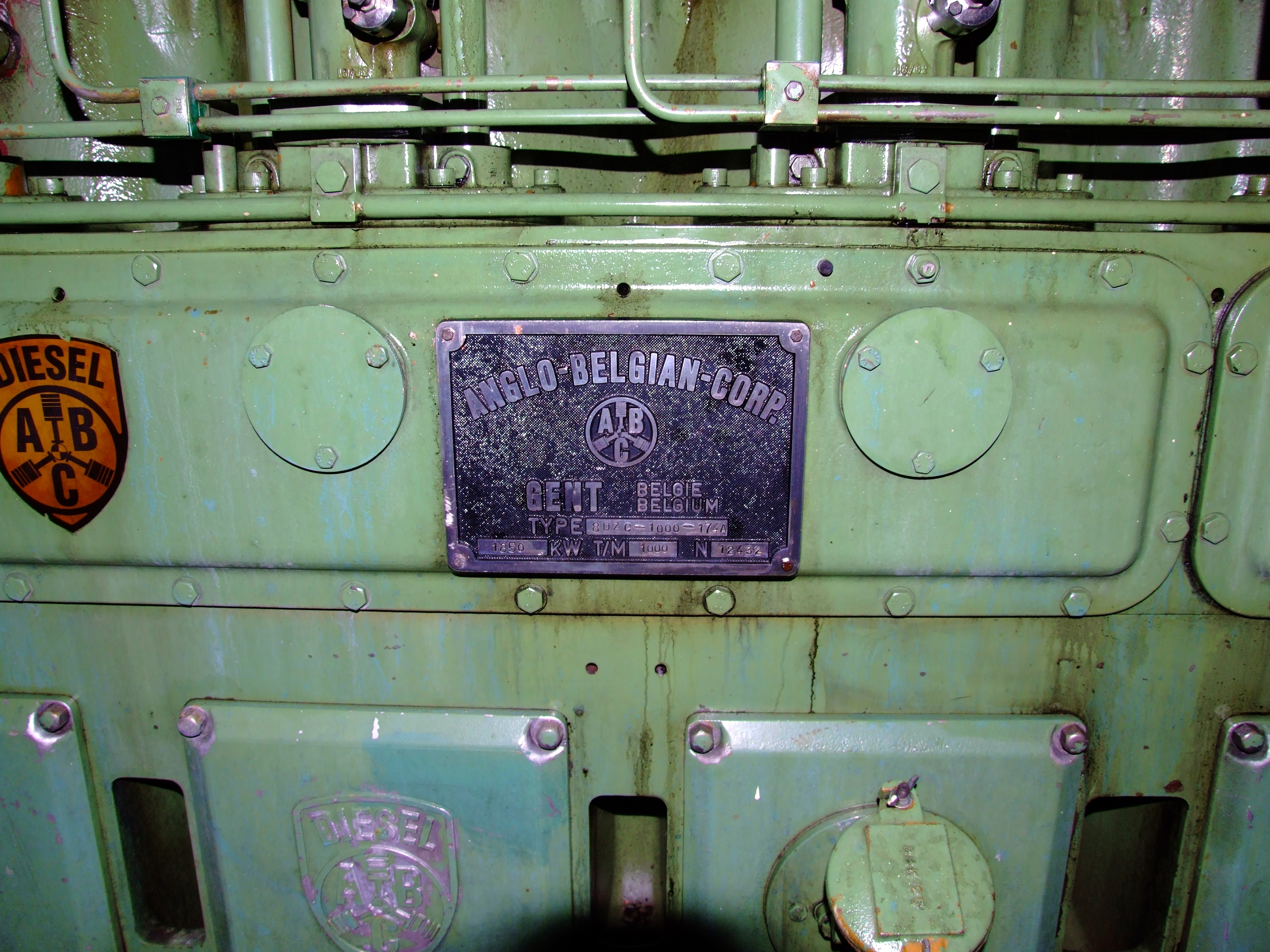
Anglo Belgian Corporation diesel engine

The Anglo Belgian Corporation (ABC) is a Belgian manufacturer of medium speed diesel engines, primarily for the marine market, as well as stationary and locomotive markets.

== History ==
=== 1912-1939 ===
On 26 October 1912 the Anglo Belgian corporation was founded; the company was to manufacture the new semi-diesel engines. One of the investors was the Onghena company, a manufacturer of gas engines, which would contribute part of their factory space and machinery towards the production of the new machines. Eight investors including Onghena each contributed 500,000 Belgian francs towards the enterprise; a ninth investor the company Carels Brothers contributed diesel engine manufacturing licenses in exchange for a 5% return of the company's turnover.

The name of the new company was Anglo Belgian Company, the Anglo indicating that some of the investment capital was to come from Britain, however World War I intervened and no capital was to come from England, but the name was kept. Initial production included engines ranging from 6 to 40 horsepower. After the end of the First World War (during which the factory had been occupied and its machines taken to Germany), the company began normal production again. The company survived the Great Depression due to the relatively stable nature of its customer base, the fishing and shipping industries. Later in the interwar period the company obtained a license from Paxman Ricardo for the production of 1500 rpm engines.

=== 1939-1970 ===
During the Second World War, production continued at a reduced level. Also, during this period, prototypes for a medium-speed four-stroke single-acting engine were produced, codenamed DU (diesel universal). In the decades after the Second World War, the DU engine was developed and modified: 5-, 6- and 8-cylinder versions were produced, turbocharged versions (codenamed DUX) with 50% more power than the equivalent non-turbocharged version were made, as were naturally aspirated versions, including turbocharged and intercooled versions. The company was prosperous up to the 1970s, and its engines were used in ships, locomotives (usually of the shunting type) and for electricity generation.

=== 1970-1989 - Challenging times ===
During the 1970s the company's financial situation became unfavourable, exacerbated by the loss of one major market, the Belgian Congo, which had become independent in 1960 and could not afford new engines. In 1973, the license for the manufacture of high-speed engines was obtained from SEMT Pielstick; additionally the company developed an entirely new engine codenamed DZC operating at 1000 rpm. By 1979 the company needed capital, negotiations with private investors failed, and the company went bankrupt. The company restarted under new management and with new investors (the companies Pauwels, Batibo, and the Belgian Shipbuilding Corporation as well as with government investment) and was renamed Anglo Belgian Corporation. Problems with production versions of the DZC engine required further investment to fix, and the shareholders lost confidence in the company, refusing an increase in capital. As a result, they passed their shares to Ogepar, a Luxembourg-based holding company, thereby raising 75,000,000 Belgian francs in capital.

=== 1990-2010 - Resetting the path for growth ===
The modified DZC engine was a success, as was its association with Ogepar. Despite the collapse of the Belgian shipbuilding industry, new markets were found, including overseas power plants. In 1997, a V-formed version of the DZC engine was developed, and the power range of the DZC series was extended to 5,000 hp (3,700 kW) The newly designed VDZC engine met all expectations, and it contributed to the organic growth of the company. Since the launch of this engine, over 1200 units have been produced at the Ghent factory, for various applications. Over time, the VDZC's product range grew to include larger turnkey projects. The largest of these arose in 2009 in Brazzaville, Congo, where a standalone power plant was built with ten 16VDZC engines, generating a total of 32MW of electrical power.

=== 2011-2019 Increasing R&D and innovations ===
In January 2011, Tim Berckmoes, who had been working at the firm since 1999, was appointed as General Manager.

In order to extend the existing product range, ABC designed a new engine. ABC's engineering department, together with the Austrian engineering company AVL, worked intensively on this project. A new production and assembly facility was launched at the beginning of 2011. A new 5,000 m^{2} building was completed in 2012. The facility included late-model tooling machines, equipment and test-benches, along with assembly robots.

Since then, ABC has been awarded numerous new projects for large customers around the globe. Examples include backup diesel generators for nuclear power plants at the French utility EDF, as well as diesel engines for various navies, dredging companies, mining companies, port authorities, tugboat firms, and passenger ferries.

In 2019, ABC was awarded the Trends Gazelle Award for the fastest-growing export company in Belgium in its category.

In 2019, a joint venture between ABC and CMB was initiated in order to produce hydrogen internal combustion engines with a power output of between 0,8 and 2,8 MW. Besides producing dual-fuel engines, the joint venture is also working on a monofuel hydrogen engine.

=== 2020 and later ===
After a COVID year, where the factory managed to stay open and maintain production, ABC introduced the new EVOLVE engine range at the 2021 Europort show in Rotterdam, Holland.

== Products ==
As of 2019, the company produces 6- and 8-cylinder DL36 engines in power ranges from 3950 to 5200 kW, inline 6- and 8-cylinder DZ engines from 864 to 1768 kW, and 12- and 16-cylinder V engines (V-DZC) of rated power either 2650 kW or 3536 kW.

The engines are found on large river barges such as those found on the Rhine, coastal freighters, fishing boats, ferries, tugboats (which typically use two engines), and other ships. Other applications include electricity generation, pumping engines, engines for cranes, and also locomotives (including the Belgian Railways Class 77 and Voith Maxima), as well as dual fuel (gas/oil) DZD engines.

The DL and DV36 range are large-bore (365mm) series with outputs between 3900 and 10400 kW. These are intended for larger ships and oversized powerplants.

The hydrogen internal combustion engines, made by BeHydro (see above) are used in the HydroTug.

The EL23, a multi-fuel model, is the newest engine in the range. It offers fuel flexibility to owners and operators who are interested in an engine platform that provides a combination of liquid-fuel combustion with compression ignition and gaseous-fuel combustion with spark ignition.
