= List of ships of the Argentine Navy =

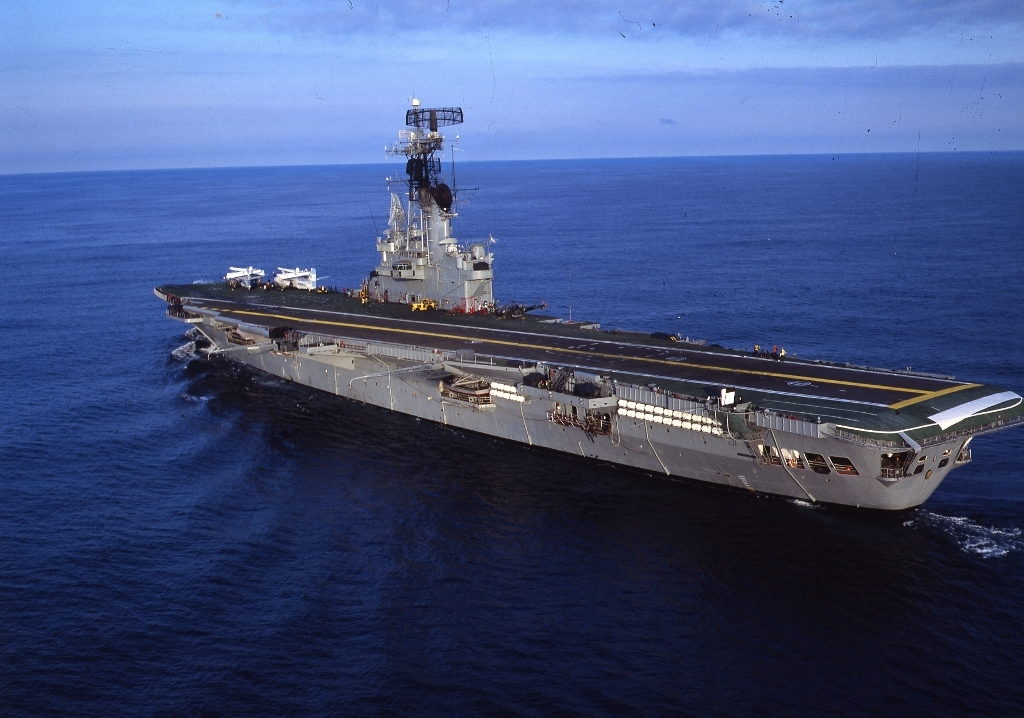
ARA Veinticinco de Mayo aircraft carrier

This list includes all major warships that entered service with the Argentine Navy since being formally established in the 1860s. (Note: In 1861 the modern Argentine Republic was born, after the Battle of Pavón.) It also includes ships that were purchased by Argentina but did not enter service under Argentine flag. The list does not include vessels prior to the 1860s; and it also excludes auxiliary ships (tugs, transports, colliers, tankers, scientific vessels, etc.) which are listed separately.

In addition, there is a separate list of ships currently in service with the Argentine Navy, regardless the type.

The list is organized by type of ship, by class within each type, and by entry date within each class. Service entry dates indicate the ship's commissioning into the Argentine Navy, and not the ship's entry in service with another navy unless specifically said.

== Naming tradition ==
The current norms establish naming conventions for Argentine Navy ships according to their type, some of them specific to warships are summarized below.

Destroyers, frigates, corvettes
Naval heroes, or names of significantly historic ships
Submarines
Province names, with priority those starting with S
Mine warfare ships
Province names, not used by submarines
Amphibious warfare ships
Coastal geographic features
Fast attack ships
Adjectives symbolizing qualities of combat ships

== List of ships ==
=== Aircraft carriers ===
Colossus class (British-built)

Ship name	Pennant number	Picture	Launched	Service entry	Decommissioned	Other names	Fate
ARA Independencia	V-1		1944	1959	1970	ex-HMS Warrior, ex-HMCS Warrior	Scrapped 1971
ARA Veinticinco de Mayo	V-2		1943	1969	1999	ex-HNLMS Karel Doorman, formerly HMS Venerable	Scrapped 1999

=== Battleships ===
Almirante Brown ironclad (British-built)

Ship name	Pennant number	Picture	Launched	Service entry	Decommissioned	Other names	Fate
ARA Almirante Brown	none		1880	1881	1932	none	Scrapped

Libertad-class coastal battleships (British-built)

Ship name	Pennant number	Picture	Launched	Service entry	Decommissioned	Other names	Fate
ARA Libertad	none		1892	1892	1946	none	To coast guard 1947
ARA Independencia	none		1891	1893	1946	none	To coast guard 1949

Rivadavia-class dreadnoughts (US-built)

Ship name	Pennant number	Picture	Launched	Service entry	Decommissioned	Other names	Fate
ARA Rivadavia	none		1911	1915	1957	none	Sold for scrap 1957
ARA Moreno	none		1911	1915	1957	none	Sold for scrap 1957

=== Monitors ===
El Plata class (British-built)

Ship name	Pennant number	Picture	Launched	Service entry	Decommissioned	Other names	Fate
ARA El Plata	none		1874	1875	1930	none	Scrapped
ARA Los Andes	none		1874	1875	1930	none	Scrapped

=== Cruisers ===
Patagonia protected cruiser (Austro-Hungarian-built)

Ship name	Pennant number	Picture	Launched	Service entry	Decommissioned	Other names	Fate
ARA Patagonia	none		1886	1886	1925	none	Scrapped

Protected Elswick cruisers (British-built)

Ship name	Pennant number	Picture	Launched	Service entry	Decommissioned	Other names	Fate
ARA Veinticinco de Mayo	none		1890	1891	1916	Ordered as Necochea, renamed before completion	Scrapped 1927
ARA Nueve de Julio	none		1892	1893	1930	none	Scrapped
ARA Buenos Aires	none		1895	1896	1932	none	Sold for scrap 1935

Patria torpedo cruiser (British-built)

Ship name	Pennant number	Picture	Launched	Service entry	Decomm.	Other names	Fate
ARA Patria	none		1893	1894	1927	none	

Giuseppe Garibaldi-class armoured cruisers (Italian-built)

Ordered from Italian shipyards. Two ships, Rivadavia and Mariano Moreno, were sold to Japan prior to completion as per naval disarmament agreements with Chile.

Ship name	Pennant number	Picture	Launched	Service entry	Decommissioned	Other names	Fate
ARA Garibaldi	none		1895	1896	1934		Sold for scrap 1937
ARA San Martín	none		1895	1898	1935		Scrapped 1947
ARA General Belgrano	none		1897	1898	1933		To coast guard 1933, stricken 1947, sold for scrap 1953
ARA Pueyrredón	none		1897	1898	1954		Sold for scrap 1957
ARA Rivadavia	none		1902	Sold before completion to Japan, no service. (1903−1942 in Japan)		Ordered as Mitre, later renamed. Japanese name Kasuga	Sunk 1945, salvaged and broken up for scrap 1948
ARA Mariano Moreno	none		1903	Sold before completion to Japan, no service. (1903−1935 in Japan)		Ordered as Roca, later renamed. Japanese name Nisshin	Sunk as target 1936, raised and sunk as target again 1942

Almirante Brown-class heavy cruisers (Italian-built)

Ship name	Pennant number	Picture	Launched	Service entry	Decommissioned	Other names	Fate
ARA Almirante Brown	C-1		1929	1931	1961	none	Sold for scrap 1962
ARA Veinticinco de Mayo	C-2		1929	1931	1961	none	Scrapped 1960

La Argentina light cruiser (British-built)

ARA La Argentina was a light cruiser, designed for training naval cadets.

Ship name	Pennant n	Picture	Launched	Service entry	Decommissioned	Other names	Fate
ARA La Argentina	C-3		1937	1939	1972	none	Scrapped 1974

General Belgrano class (US Brooklyn class)

Ship name	Pennant number	Picture	Launched	Service entry	Decommissioned	Other names	Fate
ARA General Belgrano	C-4		1938	1951	1982†	ARA Diecisiete de Octubre till 1956, ex-USS Phoenix	Sunk by British submarine HMS Conqueror during the Falklands War
ARA Nueve de Julio	C-5		1936	1951	1977	ex-USS Boise	Scrapped 1983

=== Torpedo boats ===
Maipu-class torpedo ram (British-built)

Bathurst class (British-built; Yarrow 1890 type – Mod GB TB 79 type)

Ship name	Pennant number	Other names	Service entry	Decommissioned
ARA Bathurst	none	none	1890	1927
ARA Buchardo	none	none	1890	1927
ARA Jorge	none	none	1890	1926
ARA King	none	none	1890	1926
ARA Pinedo	none	none	1890	1926
ARA Thorne	none	none	1890	1926

Espora class (British-built)

1st class Thornycroft class (British-built)

2nd class Thornycroft class (British-built)

2nd class Yarrow class (British-built)

Riverine Yarrow class (British-built)

=== Destroyers ===
Corrientes class (British-built)

Ship name	Pennant number	Other names	Service entry	Decommissioned
ARA Corrientes	none	none	1897	1930
ARA Misiones	none	none	1897	1930
ARA Entre Rios	none	none	1896	1930
ARA Santa Fe	none	none	1896	1897 (Note: Sunk in shipwreck during patrol in the River Plate off Colonia del Sacramento, Uruguay.)

Catamarca class (German-built)

Ship name	Pennant number	Other names	Service entry	Decommissioned
ARA Catamarca	none	none	1912	1957
ARA Jujuy	none	none	1912	1957

La Plata class (German-built)

Ship name	Pennant number	Other names	Service entry	Decommissioned
ARA Córdoba	none	none	1912	1957
ARA La Plata	none	none	1912	1957

Eight other destroyers were ordered around this time but never entered service with the Argentine Navy. See Aetos-class destroyer (Greece) and Aventurier-class destroyer (France).

Cervantes class (Spanish-built)

Ship name	Pennant number	Other names	Service entry	Decommissioned
ARA Cervantes	D-1	ex-Alcalá Galiano	1928	1961
ARA Juan de Garay	D-2	ex-Churruca	1928	1960

Ordered by the Spanish Navy and sold to Argentina prior to completion.

Mendoza class (British-built)

Ship name	Pennant number	Other names	Service entry	Decommissioned
ARA Mendoza	D-3	none	1929	1961
ARA La Rioja	D-4	none	1929	1962
ARA Tucuman	D-5	none	1929	1962

Buenos Aires class (British-built)

Ship name	Pennant number	Other names	Service entry	Decommissioned
ARA Buenos Aires	T-6 / D-6	none	1938	1971
ARA Entre Rios	T-7 / D-7	none	1938	1971
ARA Corrientes	T-8	none	1938	1941 (Note: Sunk after collision with the heavy cruiser ARA Almirante Brown during fleet exercises off Mar del Plata.)
ARA San Juan	T-9 / D-9	none	1938	1971
ARA San Luis	T-10 / D-10	none	1938	1970
ARA Misiones	T-11 / D-11	none	1938	1970
ARA Santa Cruz	T-12 / D-12	none	1939	1972

Brown/Almirante Domecq García class (leased US Fletcher class)

Ship name	Pennant number	Picture	Launched	Service entry	Decomm.	Other names	Fate
ARA Brown	D-20		1942	1961	1979	ex-USS Heermann	Scrapped 1982
ARA Espora	D-21		1943	1961	1979	ex-USS Dortch	Scrapped 1979
ARA Rosales	D-22		1943	1961	1981	ex-USS Stembel	Scrapped 1981
ARA Almirante Domecq Garcia	D-23		1943	1971	1982	ex-USS Braine	Sunk in live fire missile test 1983
ARA Almirante Storni	D-24		1943	1971	1981	ex-USS Cowell	Scrapped 1982

Seguí class (modified US Allen M. Sumner class)

Ship name	Pennant number	Picture	Launched	Service entry	Decommissioned	Other names	Fate
ARA Seguí	D-25		1944	1972	1983	ex-USS Hank	Scrapped 1983
ARA Bouchard	D-26		1944	1972	1984	ex-USS Borie	Scrapped 1984
ARA Piedra Buena (Note: Named alternatively Piedrabuena in some sources.)	D-29		1944	1977	1985	ex-USS Collett	Sunk by missile in naval exercise 1988

Py class (modified US Gearing class)

Ship name	Pennant number	Picture	Launched	Service entry	Decommissioned	Other names	Fate
ARA Py	D-27		1944	1973	1984	ex-USS Perkins	Sunk as target 1987

Hércules class (British Type 42 destroyers)

Ship name	Pennant number	Picture	Launched	Service entry	Decommissioned	Other names	Fate
ARA Hércules	D-28, D-1, now B-52		1972	1976	—	none	Since 1999 transformed into a multi-purpose transport ship; inactive as of 2020
ARA Santísima Trinidad	D-2		1974	1981	—	none	Formally in reserve since 2004. Sunk 2013, salvaged 2015, awaiting possible conversion to museum ship

Almirante Brown class (German MEKO 360H2 type)

Ship name	Pennant number	Picture	Launched	Service entry	Decommissioned	Other names	Fate
ARA Almirante Brown	D-10		1981	1983	—	none	In active service
ARA La Argentina	D-11		1981	1983	—	none	In active service
ARA Heroína	D-12		1982	1983	—	none	Inactive
ARA Sarandí	D-13		1982	1984	—	none	In active service

=== Frigates and corvettes ===
Murature class (Locally designed and built)

Ship name	Pennant number	Other names	Service entry	Decommissioning
ARA Murature	P-20	none	1946	2014
ARA King	P-21	none	1946	in service (Note: As of November 2015, ARA King is being overhauled.)

Hércules class (River/Tacoma-class World War II frigates)

Ship name	Pennant number	Other names	Service entry	Decommissioning
ARA Hércules	P-31	ex-USS Asheville, ex-HMS Adur	18 February 1948	1961, transferred (Note: Transferred to Prefectura Naval Argentina (Argentine Coast Guard) and renamed PNA Juan Bautista Azopardo) sold 1969
ARA Heroína	P-32	ex-USS Reading	8 February 1947	sold 5 August 1964
ARA Sarandí	P-33	ex-USS Uniontown, ex- USSChattanooga	18 February 1948	sold 29 June 1967
ARA Santísima Trinidad	P-34	ex-HMS Caicos, ex-USS Hannam	1948	1963, converted (Note: Converted to a survey vessel and renamed ARA Comodoro Lasserre.) sold 1970 or 1971

República class (Flower class)

Ship name	Pennant number	Other names	Service entry	Decommissioning
ARA República	P-10	ex-HMS Smilax	1948	1961

Azopardo class (Locally designed and built)

Ship name	Pennant number	Other names	Service entry	Decommissioning
ARA Azopardo	P-35	none	1957	1972
ARA Piedra Buena (Note: Named alternatively Piedrabuena in some sources.)	P-36	none	1957	1973

Drummond class (French D'Estienne d'Orves class)

Ship name	Pennant number	Other names	Service entry	Decommissioning
ARA Drummond	P-31	ex-SAS Good Hope	1978 (Note: Originally being built for the South African Navy before UN sanctions were applied to South Africa; was acquired prior to completion.)	In reserve
ARA Guerrico	P-32	ex-SAS Transvaal	1978 (Note: Originally being built for the South African Navy before UN sanctions were applied to South Africa; was acquired prior to completion.)	In reserve
ARA Granville	P-33	none	1981	active

Espora class (German MEKO 140A16 type, locally built)

Ship name	Pennant number	Other names	Service entry	Decommissioning
ARA Espora	P-41	none	1985	active
ARA Rosales	P-42	none	1986	Inactive
ARA Spiro	P-43	none	1988	active
ARA Parker	P-44	none	1990	active
ARA Robinson	P-45	none	2000 (Note: Construction was halted due to budgetary issues, then resumed in 1997.)	active
ARA Gómez Roca	P-46	none	2004 (Note: Construction was halted due to budgetary issues, then resumed in 1997.)	active

=== Patrol, torpedo and fast attack craft ===
Zurubí class (Argentine-built)

Ship name	Pennant number	Other names	Service entry	Decommissioning
ARA Zurubí	P-55	P-36	1939	active (Note: Transferred in 1944 to the Navy as a patrol boat with pennant number P-36. Decommissioned in 1985, refurbished and re-commissioned in 1993. As of February 2016 is in service based at Ushuaia.)

Intrépida class (German-built) – known as "fast craft" ((in Spanish) lánchas rápidas)

Ship name	Pennant number	Other names	Service entry	Decommissioning
ARA Intrépida	P-85	none	1974	active (Note: A 40mm gun mount was replaced by MM38 Exocet launcher in 1998.)
ARA Indómita	P-86	none	1974	active (Note: At shipyard awaiting overhaul as of late 2014.)

Baradero class (Israeli-built Dabur class)

Ship name	Pennant number	Other names	Service entry	Decommissioning
ARA Baradero	P-61	none	1978	active
ARA Barranqueras	P-62	none	1978	active
ARA Clorinda	P-63	none	1978	active
ARA Concepción del Uruguay	P-64	none	1978	active

Punta Mogotes class (US-built Point class)

Ship name	Pennant number	Other names	Service entry	Decommissioning
ARA Punta Mogotes	P-65	ex-Point Hobart (WPB-82377)	1999	active
ARA Río Santiago	P-66	ex-Point Carrew (WPB-82374)	2000	active

=== Gunboats ===
Paraná class (British-built) – also classified as "corvettes"

Ship name	Pennant number	Other names	Service entry	Decommissioning
ARA Paraná	none	none	1875	1921 (Note: Converted to a transport and renamed ARA Piedra Buena. Sunk during a storm.)
ARA Uruguay	none	none	1875	active (Note: Currently a museum ship docked at Buenos Aires; nominally in commission in the Argentine Navy and declared a National Historical Monument.)

Constitución class (British-built) – locally classified as "bombarderas", they were of the Rendel gunboat type.

Ship name	Pennant number	Other names	Service entry	Decommissioning
ARA Constitución	none	none	1875	1955
ARA República	none	none	1875	1955

Bermejo class (British-built) – locally classified as "bombarderas", (Note: "Histarmar" list this class as Pilcomayo rather than Bermejo.) they were of the Rendel gunboat type.

Ship name	Pennant number	Other names	Service entry	Decommissioning
ARA Bermejo	none	none	1875	1932
ARA Pilcomayo	none	none	1875	1935

Rosario class (British-built) – armoured river gunboats

Ship name	Pennant number	Other names	Service entry	Decommissioning
ARA Rosario	none	none	1909	1959
ARA Paraná	none	none	1909	1959

=== Amphibious warfare ===
Cabo San Bartolome class (ex-United States Landing Ship, Tank)

Ship name	Pennant number	Other names	Service entry	Decommissioning
ARA Cabo San Bartolome	BDT-1 / Q-41	USS LST-851	1948	1968
ARA Cabo San Diego	BDT-2	USS LST-995 / Don Nicolas	1948	1966
ARA Cabo San Francisco de Paula	BDT-3	USS LST-998 / Don Ernesto	1948	1968
ARA Cabo San Gonzalo	BDT-4 / Q-44	USS LST-872 / Doña Micaela	1948	1979

Cabo San Antonio class (Locally-built De Soto County)

Ship name	Pennant number	Other names	Service entry	Decommissioning
ARA Cabo San Antonio	Q-42	none	1977	1997

Cándido de Lasala class (ex-United States)

Ship name	Pennant number	Other names	Service entry	Decommissioning
ARA Cándido de Lasala	Q-43	ex-USS Gunston Hall	1970	1981

=== Mine warfare ===
Bathurst class (German-built M1915 and M1916 classes)

Ship name	Pennant number	Other names	Service entry	Decommissioning
ARA Bathurst	M-1	ex-German M-48	1922	1960s
ARA Fournier	M-2	ex-German M-51	1922	1960s
ARA Jorge	M-3	ex-German M-52	1922	1960s
ARA King	M-4	ex-German M-53	1922	1960s
ARA Murature	M-5	ex-German M-74	1922	1960s
ARA Pinedo	M-6	ex-German M-79	1922	1960s
ARA Py	M-7	ex-German M-80	1922	1960s
ARA Segui	M-8	ex-German M-90	1922	1960s
ARA Thorne	M-9	ex-German M-101	1922	1960s
ARA Golondrina	M-10	ex-German M-105	1922	1960s

Neuquén class (British-built Ton class) (Note: The service entry date shown in this article is the one listed in the individual ships history, while the page cited shows an earlier date.)

Ship name	Pennant number	Other names	Service entry	Decommissioning
ARA Neuquén	M-1	ex-British Hickleton (M1131)	1968	1996
ARA Río Negro	M-2	ex-British Tariton (M1186)	1968	1977
ARA Chubut	M-3	ex-British Santon (M1178)	1968	1995
ARA Tierra del Fuego	M-4	ex-British Bevington (M1108)	1968	1995
ARA Chaco	M-5	ex-British Rennington (M1176)	1969	2003
ARA Formosa	M-6	ex-British Ilmington (M1148)	1968	2003

Bouchard class (Argentine-built minesweepers/minelayers) (Note: The Bouchard class ships were classified as mine Trackers ((in Spanish) Rastreadores) by the Argentine Navy.)

Ship name	Pennant number	Other names	Service entry	Decommissioning
ARA Bouchard	M-7	Nanawa (Paraguayan Navy)	1937	1964 (Note: Sold to Paraguay, renamed Nanawa.)
ARA Drummond	M-2	none	1937	1964
ARA Granville	M-4	none	1937	1967
ARA Parker	M-11	none	1937	1963
ARA Spiro	M-13	none	1938	1962 (Note: Transferred to the Argentine Coast Guard.)
ARA Robinson	M-3	none	1939	1967
ARA Seaver	M-12	Capitán Meza (Paraguayan Navy)	1939	1968 (Note: Sold to Paraguay, renamed Capitán Meza.)
ARA Py	M-10	Teniente Fariña (Paraguayan Navy)	1939	1968 (Note: Sold to Paraguay, renamed Teniente Fariña.)
ARA Fournier	M-5	none	1940	1949 (Note: Sunk in the surroundings of Cono Point (Tierra del Fuego) with all hands.)

=== Submarines ===
By tradition, Argentine submarines bear the names of provinces whose names begin with the letter "S", thus, the pool of names is limited to only six ("Santa Fe", "Salta", "Santiago del Estero", "San Luis", "San Juan" and "Santa Cruz") resulting in repeated class and ship names.

Santa Fe (1) class (Italian-built Tarantinos)

Ship name	Pennant number	Other names	Service entry	Decommissioning
ARA Santa Fe	S-1	none	1933	1956
ARA Salta	S-2	none	1933	1960
ARA Santiago del Estero	S-3	none	1933	1959

Santa Fe (2) class (US-built Balao class)

Ship name	Pennant number	Other names	Service entry	Decommissioning
ARA Santa Fe	S-11	ex-USS Macabi	1960	1972
ARA Santiago del Estero	S-12	ex-USS Lamprey	1960	1971

Santa Fe (3) class (US-built Guppy class)

Ship name	Pennant number	Other names	Service entry	Decommissioning
ARA Santa Fe	S-21	ex-USS Catfish	1972	1982 (Note: Sunk during the Falklands War.)
ARA Santiago del Estero	S-22	ex-USS Chivo	1971	1981

Salta class (German-built Type 209)

Ship name	Pennant number	Other names	Service entry	Decommissioning
ARA Salta	S-31	none	1974	Inactive (Note: Incapable of navigation; used for dockside training as of 2020.)
ARA San Luis	S-32	none	1974	1997 (Note: Stricken from the fleet list after incomplete overhaul.)

Santa Cruz class (German-built TR-1700 type)

Six of these ships were planned by the Navy. Only the first two, built in Germany, were actually completed. The other four, to be built in Argentina, were never completed due to budgetary concerns.

Ship name	Pennant number	Other names	Service entry	Decommissioning
ARA Santa Cruz	S-41	none	1984	Inactive (Note: Refit cancelled as of 2020.)
ARA San Juan	S-42	none	1985	Lost 2017
ARA Santa Fe	S-43	none	never completed	never completed
ARA Santiago del Estero	S-44	none	never completed	never completed
S-45	none	never completed	never completed	
S-46	none	never completed	never completed	

=== Sailing warships ===
La Argentina class (Austria-Hungary-built) formally classified as a sailing corvette

Ship name	Pennant number	Other names	Service entry	Decommissioning
ARA La Argentina	none	none	1884	1900

Presidente Sarmiento class (British-built)

Ship name	Pennant number	Other names	Service entry	Decommissioning
ARA Presidente Sarmiento	none	none	1898	active (Note: Used as a training vessel until 1930s, and retired from all training duties in 1961, is currently moored at Buenos Aires as a museum ship.)

== See also ==
- List of auxiliary ships of the Argentine Navy
