= List of active Argentine Navy ships =

Argentine naval ensign

The list of active ships of the Argentine Navy includes ships currently in commission with the Navy, or operated by the Navy on behalf of other organizations.

As of the mid-2020s, there were about 40 commissioned ships in the navy, including 3 destroyers, 1 amphibious support ship and 2 submarines (though both boats were non-operational as of 2022). The draft 2023 budget submitted to Congress envisages 60 days of navigation for technical and tactical naval training. These were 19 fewer days than in 2022. In 2024, the Navy managed a total of 139 days of navigation. In contrast, in 2012 the naval force was allocated 358 sailing days. However, the 2025 defence budget envisaged the navy as completing 480 days of "navigation" in that year.

As part of the Argentinian Navy’s modernisation and streamlining plans, in September 2024, it was announced that four of its older ships would be auctioned off, including two corvettes, a tugboat and a survey ship. Subsequently, all three of the navy's Drummond-class corvettes were retired following prolonged inactivity for two of the three vessels.

== Warships ==
=== Submarines ===
As of 2025, the entire submarine fleet is inactive.

Class	No.	Boat	Commissioned	Displacement	Note	Picture
Attack submarines
(West Germany) / (Argentina) Santa Cruz	S-41	Santa Cruz (in reserve)	1984	2,264 tonnes	Reported "inactive", refit cancelled as of 2020	
(West Germany) Salta	S-31	Salta (in reserve)	1973	1,248 tonnes	Reported inactive as of 2020	

=== Destroyers ===
Note: Argentina uses the classification destructores (destroyers) for the Almirante Brown class, despite them being analogous to medium frigates by most international classifications.

Class	No.	Ship	Commissioned	Displacement	Note	Picture
Destroyers						
(West Germany) Almirante Brown	D-10; D-11; D-13	Almirante Brown; La Argentina; Sarandí	1983; 1983; 1984	3,600 tonnes	Heroína (D-12) formally retired from service in 2024 after prolonged inactivity.	ARA Sarandi

=== Corvettes ===
Class	No.	Ship	Commissioned	Displacement	Note	Picture
Corvettes
(Argentina) / (West Germany) Espora	P-41; P-42; P-43; P-44; P-45; P-46	Espora; Rosales; Spiro; Parker; Robinson; Gómez Roca	1985; 1986; 1987; 1990; 2001; 2004	1,790 tonnes	Parker inactive as of mid-2025	ARA Robinson

=== Patrol vessels ===
Class	No.	Ship	Commissioned	Displacement	Note	Picture
Offshore patrol vessels						
Gowind	P-51; P-52; P-53; P-54	Bouchard; Piedrabuena; Almirante Storni; Bartolomé Cordero	2019; 2021; 2021; 2022	1,650 tonnes	Built by Naval Group, France.	
(Argentina) Murature-class patrol ship	P-21	King	1946	1,032 tonnes	Converted minelayer Used primarily as training vessel. (Note: Overhauled from 2015 to 2018.) Sister ship Murature decommissioned September 2014	ARA Murature (P-20)
Fast attack craft						
(West Germany) Intrépida	P-85; P-86	Intrépida; Indómita	1974; 1974	268 tonnes		ARA Intrépida (P-85)
Patrol boats						
(Argentina) Zurubí	P-55	Zurubí	1939	33 tonnes	Decommissioned in 1985, refurbished and re-commissioned in 1993. (Note: Transferred in 1944 to the Navy as a patrol boat with pennant number P-36. As of February 2016 is in active service with pennant number P-55 based at Ushuaia.)	
(United States) / (Israel) Baradero	P-61; P-62; P-63; P-64	Baradero; Barranqueras; Clorinda; Concepción del Uruguay	1978; 1978; 1978; 1978	39 tonnes	Patrol boats sold by Israel	ARA Concepción del Uruguay (P-64), while it was in Israeli service
(United States) Punta Mogotes	P-65; P-66	Punta Mogotes; Río Santiago	2000	26.5 tonnes	1970s era patrol boats acquired from US	ARA Río Santiago under way

=== Amphibious support ship ===
Amphibious support ship
Class	No.	Ship	Commissioned	Displacement	Note	Picture
(Argentina) Modified Costa Sur	B-4	Bahía San Blas	1978	10,894 tonnes	Used as an amphibious cargo ship.	

== Auxiliary vessels ==
Class	No.	Ship	Commissioned	Displacement	Note	Picture
Icebreaker						
(Finland) Almirante Irízar	Q-5	ARA Almirante Irízar (Q-5)	1978	14,899 tonnes	Returned to active service in April 2017 following several years of repairs.	
Survey vessels						
(Argentina) Puerto Deseado	Q-20	Puerto Deseado	1978	2,400 tonnes		
(Germany) Austral	Q-21	Austral	2015	4,900 tonnes	ex-Sonne, operated by the Navy for the CONICET; returned to service 2021 following maintenance.	
Tanker						
(France) Durance	B-1	Patagonia	2000	17,800 tonnes	ex-Durance of the French Navy. (Note: Patagonia is the primary under-way replenishment ship of the Argentine Navy)	
Cargo ship						
(Argentina) Costa Sur	B-3	Canal Beagle	1978	10,894 tonnes		
Coastal buoy tenders						
(United States) Red	Q-61; Q-62; Q-63	Ciudad de Zárate; Ciudad de Rosario; Punta Alta	2000; 2000; 2000	525 tonnes		
Training ships						
(Argentina) Libertad	Q-2	Libertad	1963	3,765 tonnes	In service	
(Argentina) Luisito	Q-51	Luisito	1983		Used by the National Fishing School	
(Argentina) LICA		Ciudad de Ensenada; Ciudad de Berisso	2024; 2024	282 tonnes	Officer cadet training	
Yacht						
(Argentina) Fortuna		Fortuna III	2004	15 tonnes		
Aviso						
(United States) Teniente Olivieri	A-2	Teniente Olivieri	1987	1,640 tonnes		ARA Teniente Olivieri
(Poland) Neftegaz	A-21; A-22; A-23; A-24	Puerto Argentino; Estrecho San Carlos; Bahía Agradable; Islas Malvinas	2015	2.700 tonnes		ARA Islas Malvinas
Museum ship						
(Argentina) Presidente Sarmiento			1897	2,750 tonnes	She is now maintained in her original 1898 appearance as a museum ship in Puerto Madero near downtown Buenos Aires.	
(Argentina) Uruguay			1874	550 tonnes	Removed from naval service in 1962, the Uruguay was in 1967 declared a National Historic Landmark. currently integrated since 1967 as a museum ship with the frigate ARA Presidente Sarmiento in the Museum of Sea and Navigation. (Note: [Historic monument] "Monumento histórico ...el Poder Ejecutivo declaró por decreto del 06 de Junio de 1967 a la corbeta Uruguay monumento histórico, responsabilizando a la Comisión Nacional de Museos, Monumentos y Lugares Históricos, junto con la Armada de la conservación de la nave y de proyectar su futuro destino y funcionamiento.") It is moored at Puerto Madero in the city of Buenos Aires, in the dock area No. 3, a short distance from Presidente Sarmiento.	

== See also ==
- List of auxiliary ships of the Argentine Navy
- List of ships of the Argentine Navy
- Lists of currently active military equipment by country
