= Decree 457/2021 =

2021 Argentinian Defense Policy decree

Decree 457/2021 of the National Executive Power is a decree that updated the National Defense Policy Directive of the Argentine Republic. It was enacted on July 14, 2021, and published in the Official Gazette on July 19, 2021. It remains in force and has not been modified.

The decree considers the Strait of Magellan a "shared space" between Argentina and Chile. However in the Boundary Treaty of 1881 between Argentina and Chile the Strait was recognized as Chilean exclusively, with an obligation of free passing for all nations and no militarization of its shores.

== Objectives of the decree ==
The purpose of the decree is to establish the guidelines of Argentina's defense policy, and it was published during the presidency of Alberto Fernández. Specifically, it aims to "make explicit the main guidelines of the National Strategic level, in particular, the conception and strategic positioning that will continue to guide and lead issues related to National Defense."

Among other points, the decree establishes the following on page 13 of the 40-page document:

One of the shared spaces that must continue to be strengthened is the joint exploration, study, and control of the Strait of Magellan and the Drake Passage, strategic areas both for their role as natural navigation routes between the ATLANTIC OCEAN and the PACIFIC OCEAN and for being privileged access points to the Antarctic continent.

The new directives were praised in Argentina as an example of collaboration between the Ministry of Defense and the Ministry of Foreign Affairs in public policy design. Others, however—such as Juntos por el Cambio—called for the directive to be repealed.

== Argentine conceptions in the area ==
=== Prior to the 1881 treaty ===
The proposed international border in the 1875 map, marked with a cross line +, places Punta Arenas and the Brunswick Peninsula as the southernmost tip of Chile, connected by a narrow strip of land to what is now the Última Esperanza Province and, via the northern coast of the strait, to the rest of Chile. All islands south of the strait—both in the Pacific and Atlantic—would remain under Argentine sovereignty. Likewise, the coasts of the strait from Punta Arenas to the Atlantic would be Argentine.	Section of a map drawn in 1875 by Seelstrang and Tourmente for the Philadelphia Universal Exposition of 1876.

=== During the Beagle conflict ===
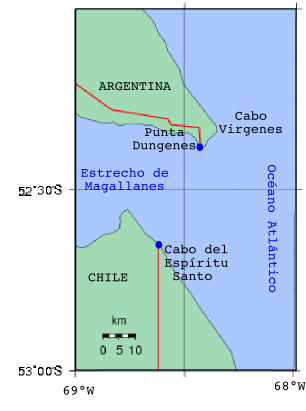
Geography of the eastern end of the strait.

During the Beagle conflict, Argentina argued that the easternmost part of the Strait lay within Argentine waters, which would make Argentina a littoral state of the strait and grant it the right to co-administer the interoceanic passage.

=== 1984 Treaty ===
The Treaty of Peace and Friendship between Argentina and Chile established the eastern boundary of the Strait as a straight line between Punta Dungeness and Cape Espíritu Santo, with both states renouncing any claim beyond that limit. Argentina retained only the obligation to allow unrestricted passage for vessels of all flags traveling to or from the Strait:

Article 10. The Argentine Republic and the Republic of Chile agree that at the eastern end of the Strait of Magellan, defined by Punta Dungeness in the North and Cape Espíritu Santo in the South, the boundary between their respective sovereignties shall be the straight line joining the "Ex-Beacon Dungeness Marker," located at the tip of said geographical feature, and the "Cape Espíritu Santo Marker I" in Tierra del Fuego.
...
The sovereignty of the Argentine Republic and the sovereignty of the Republic of Chile over the sea, seabed, and subsoil shall extend respectively to the East and West of said boundary.
The Argentine Republic undertakes to maintain, at all times and under all circumstances, the right of vessels of all flags to navigate freely and without obstacles through its jurisdictional waters to and from the Strait of Magellan.

=== Others ===
Some journalistic articles recognize the importance of the strait as a natural and safe passage between the two oceans. However, some of them reflect a perspective aligned with the Argentine perception of the area. For example, an article published by the Turkish Radio and Television Corporation (TRT), the state-owned news agency of Turkey, acknowledged an error in an earlier version of the article, but still labeled the strait as "disputed" in its headline: A previous version of this article stated that the Strait of Magellan is located in Argentine territory, which is incorrect. The Strait of Magellan is officially located in Chilean territory, except for its easternmost tip which borders Argentina. Another version of the article does not even mention Chile.

From a north-south perspective, the crossing of the strait represents a "territorial break" for Argentina. As a response, efforts are being made to physically link the mainland and insular territory (Tierra del Fuego) through Argentine jurisdictional waters by means of a regular roll-on/roll-off ferry service for cargo and passenger transport—an initiative called the *Corredor Marítimo Austral* ("Southern Maritime Corridor").

== Official reactions to the decree ==
On August 7, 2021, it was reported in the Chilean and Argentine press that the Chilean government—then led by Sebastián Piñera—had submitted a formal note of protest to the Argentine Foreign Ministry. The note stated that the Strait of Magellan, including both of its shores, is Chilean territory as established in the 1881 Treaty, and reaffirmed in the 1984 Treaty, and therefore Chile rejected the Argentine claim made in the decree.

In the same note, the Chilean government emphasized that there is also no joint control in the Drake Passage, and that Chile does not recognize the boundary line unilaterally drawn by the administration of Cristina Fernández de Kirchner.

The ambassador of the United States of America to Chile stated that her government recognized Chile's sovereignty over the Strait of Magellan.

== Status of the controversy ==
In 2025, during the government of Javier Milei, Argentina declared that it considered the previous administration of Alberto Fernández had made a "mistake" in interpreting the existing treaties by issuing such a decree. The new government committed to drafting and publishing a new "National Defense Policy Directive" that would annul the 2021 decree.

== See also ==
- Ten Cents Tax
- ARA Fournier (M-5)
- Dispute over the extended continental shelf in the Southern Zone Sea between Argentina and Chile
- Decree 256/10 which aims to force ships coming from the Falkland Islands to request permission to enter the Strait of Magellan.
