= P86 =

P86 may refer to:

== Vessels ==
- ARA Indómita (P-86), a fast attack craft of the Argentine Navy
- HMAS Archer (P 86), a patrol boat of the Royal Australian Navy
- HMS Vengeful (P86), a submarine of the Royal Navy

== Other uses ==
- DLR P86 stock, a passenger train used on the Docklands Light Railway in London, UK
- North American XP-86, an American prototype fighter aircraft
- Papyrus 86, a biblical manuscript
- Project 86, an American rock band
- P86, a state regional road in Latvia
