= ARA El Plata =

Argentine ship, built in London

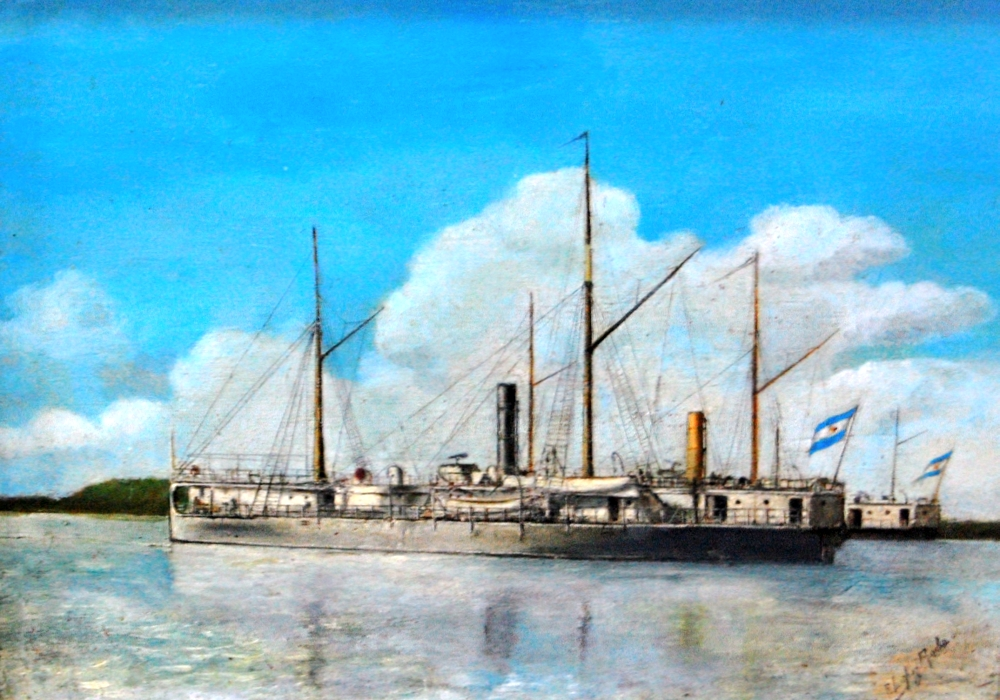
- Watercolor of El Plata

History

Argentina
- Name: ARA El Plata
- Builder: Laird Brothers, Birkenhead
- Launched: 29 August 1874
- Stricken: 16 November 1927
- Fate: Sold, 1927

General characteristics (as built)
- Type: El Plata-class monitor
- Displacement: 1,535–1,677 long tons (1,560–1,704 t)
- Length: 180 ft (54.9 m) (p/p)
- Beam: 44 ft (13.4 m)
- Draft: 9 ft 1 in (2.8 m)
- Installed power: 750 ihp (560 kW)
- Propulsion: 2 shafts, 2 compound steam engines
- Speed: 9 knots (17 km/h; 10 mph)
- Range: 1,400 nmi (2,600 km; 1,600 mi)
- Complement: 120
- Armament: 2 × 9 in (229 mm) muzzle-loading rifles; 2 × small guns
- Armor: Belt: 4.5–6 in (114–152 mm); Deck: 1 in (25 mm); Gun turret: 8–10 in (203–254 mm)

ARA El Plata was the first of two El Plata-class monitors built in Britain in the 1870s for the Argentine Navy.

== Description ==
El Plata was 186 feet (56.7 m) long overall, with a beam of 44 feet (13.4 m) and a draft of 9.5–10.5 feet (2.9–3.2 m). She displaced 1,535–1,677 long tons (1,560–1,704 t), and her crew numbered 120 officers and enlisted men.

The ship had two compound steam engines, each driving one propeller shaft, rated at a total power of 750 indicated horsepower (560 kW). This gave her a maximum speed of 9–9.5 knots (16.7–17.6 km/h; 10.4–10.9 mph). El Plata carried 120 long tons (122 t) of coal which gave her a range of approximately 1,400 nautical miles (2,600 km; 1,600 mi).

== History ==
ARA El Plata was ordered by President Sarmiento in 1872, along with her sister ship Los Andes. She was intended to serve as a river monitor, due to concerns regarding the use of low-freeboard turret ships at sea following the HMS Captain disaster. Despite the Argentine Navy's concerns, she spent much of her service life on seagoing expeditions, and she also served as a guard ship for the mouths of major rivers.

== See also ==
- List of ships of the Argentine Navy
