= Enrique Guillermo Parker =

British-born Argentine naval officer

- Born: 1787; Great Britain
- Died: 27 March 1826 (aged 38–39); Buenos Aires, Argentina
- Burial place: Cementerio de los Disidentes, Buenos Aires
- Military career
- Allegiance: United Kingdom; Argentina
- Branch: Royal Navy; Argentine Navy
- Service years: 1798–1826
- Conflicts: Cisplatine War

Enrique Guillermo Parker was a British-born Argentine Navy Captain who participated in the Cisplatine War waged by the Argentine Republic against the Empire of Brazil.

== Early life ==
Parker was born in 1787 in Great Britain. In 1798 he enrolled as an apprentice in the Royal Navy and after reaching the rank of Lieutenant, emigrated to South America in 1816.

He then joined the Argentine Navy under the command of Guillermo Brown following the approval of Brigadier General José Matías Zapiola.

At the beginning of the war with Brazil, he was in Buenos Aires and offered his services to the Argentine Navy, enlisted by Brigadier-General José Matías Zapiola.

== Later career ==
He was appointed second in command of the flagship frigate ARA Veinticinco de Mayo, before later being promoted to command the frigate.

He fought in the Battle of Punta Colares off the coast of Buenos Aires and was recognised for his bravery by Admiral Guillermo Brown.

He later received command of the brigantine Congreso, a ship which participated in the attack on Colonia del Sacramento on 1 March 1826 in which he was seriously wounded. He suffered from tuberculosis and the rigors of the campaign aggravated his ailment. Soon after, he died on 27 March 1826 at the Hospital de Sangre de la Merced in Buenos Aires and was buried in the Dissidents Cemetery in Buenos Aires.

The first vessel to bear his name was the minehunter ARA Parker (M-11). It is currently carried by the ARA Parker (P-44) corvette.
