= Q51 =

Q51 may refer to:

- Q51 (New York City bus)
- Adh-Dhariyat, a surah of the Quran
- ARA Luisito (Q-51), a training ship of the Argentine Navy
- French submarine Pluviose (Q51)
- Kili Airport, in the Marshall Islands
