= P55 =

P55 or P-55 may refer to:

== Vessels ==
- ARA Zurubí (P-55), a patrol boat of the Argentine Navy
- HMS Unsparing (P55), a submarine of the Royal Navy
- HMNZS Wellington (P55), a patrol vessel of the Royal New Zealand Navy
- INS Sharda (P55), a patrol vessel of the Indian Navy

== Other uses ==
- Curtiss-Wright XP-55 Ascender, an American experimental fighter aircraft
- Intel P55, a computer chipset
- Papyrus 55, a biblical manuscript
- PIK3R3, phosphatidylinositol 3-kinase regulatory subunit gamma
- Tumor necrosis factor receptor 1
- P55, a state regional road in Latvia
