= Rosario-class gunboat =

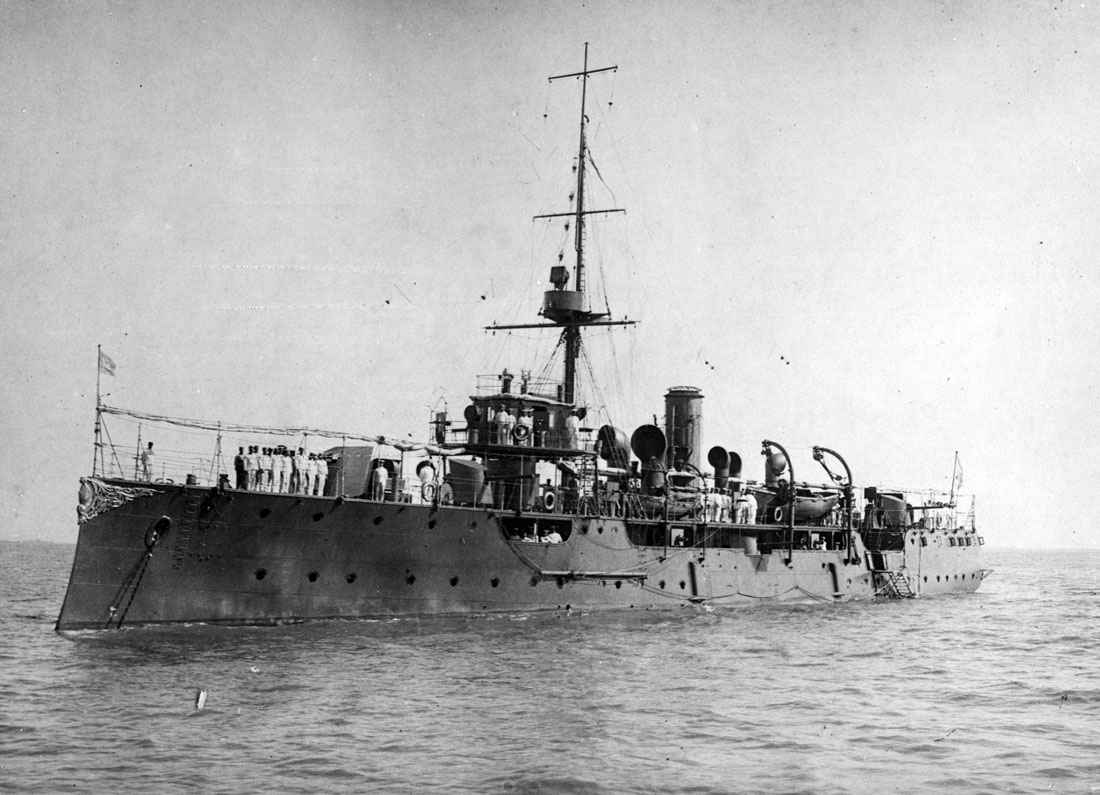
- ARA Rosario, date unknown

Class overview
- Name: Rosario class riverine gunboat
- Builders: Armstrong, Mitchell & Co., Newcastle-on-Tyne, North East England
- Operators: Argentine Navy
- Built: 1908–1909
- In service: 1909–1951
- In commission: 1909–1959
- Planned: 2
- Completed: 2
- Retired: 2

General characteristics
- Type: Rosario class gunboat
- Displacement: 709 (standard) to 1055 (full load) tons
- Length: 76.4 m (250.7 ft)
- Beam: 9.8 m (32.2 ft)
- Draft: 4.3 m (14 ft)
- Propulsion: 2-shaft, 2 × Vickers triple-expansion steam engines, 2 x Yarrow boilers, 1,300 ihp (970 kW), 160 tons coal
- Speed: 14.5 knots (16.7 mph; 26.9 km/h)
- Range: 1000 nautical miles @ 8 kn
- Complement: 145
- Armament: 2 × 152-millimetre (6 in) howitzers; 6 × 76-millimetre (3 in) guns; 4 × 7.65 mm (0.301 in) machine guns
- Armour: hull belt, deck and conning tower ( see text)
- Notes: Specifications from “Conway’s All the World’s Fighting Ships, 1906–1921”.

The Rosario-class gunboats were a class of two pre-World War I warships, designed and built in England in 1907–1909 as armoured riverine gunboats, to patrol the rivers Paraná and Uruguay. They were in service with the Argentine Navy from the late 1900s to the early 1950s. The lead ship of the class was named after Rosario, one of the major cities in Argentina.

== Design ==
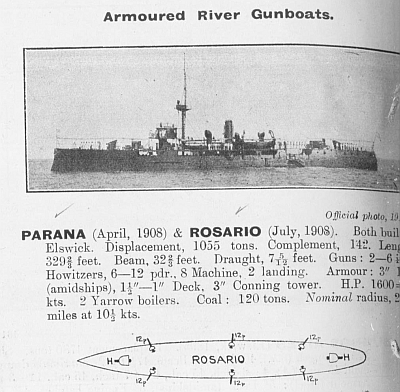
Specifications and layout, 1920 Jane's.

Argentina decided the construction of new warships due to the deterioration of relations with Brazil, who was after the naval supremacy in South America. The Brazilian Navy ordered riverine monitors to patrol the border rivers; Argentina's response was to place a contract with the British shipyard Armstrong, Mitchell & Co for the construction of two riverine gunboats.

The Rosario class gunboats had a shallow draft metal hull with a single mast and funnel on the superstructure amidships. They had an armoured belt of 4-inch (102 mm) thick Krupp cemented armour, an armoured deck 1-inch (25 mm) thick, and armoured conning tower. They were powered by two Vickers triple-expansion steam engines fed by two Yarrow boilers, driving two propellers.

Its main battery was composed of two 152-millimetre (6 in) howitzers and six 76-millimetre (3 in) guns. The secondary battery was composed of two 37 mm Nordenfelt autocannons and 4 to 8 7.65 mm (0.301 in) machine guns. It also carried two 75-millimetre (3 in) naval landing guns with wheeled carriage.

== Service history ==
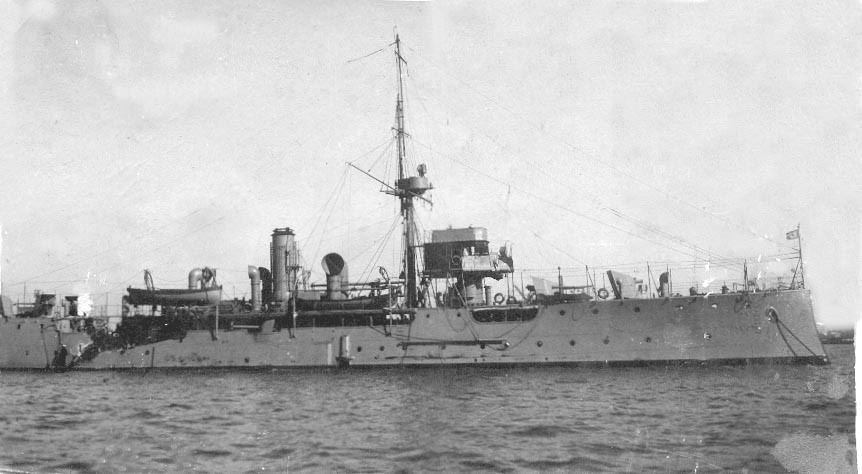
Gunboat ‘’Paraná’’, date unknown

The Rosario class was designed in the mid 1900s and the ships were laid down in 1907 and completed in 1908–1909. They were commissioned by the Argentine Navy in 1908–1909 and remained in service until the early 1950s.

Rosario and Paraná were frequently used to patrol the rivers Paraná and Uruguay; and were deployed to Asunción during the 1911 revolution in Paraguay. They were also used in training exercises, and occasionally deployed to Patagonia.

Both ships were sold for scrap after being decommissioned, and were broken up in the 1960s.

== Ships in class ==
| Ship Name | Pennant Number | Builder | Laid down | Launched | Service entry | Decommissioning |
|---|---|---|---|---|---|---|
| ARA Rosario | 21 | Armstrong, Tyne | 21 August 1907 | 8 July 1908 | 1909 | 1951 (Note: Sold for scrapping to Nicolás Idoeta, Humberto Zani y Alejandro Reborati in 1959.) |
| ARA Paraná | 20 | Armstrong, Tyne | 16 September 1907 | 28 April 1908 | 1909 | 1951 (Note: Sold for scrapping to Botto y Cochello S.R.L. in 1958.) |

== See also ==
- List of ships of the Argentine Navy
- Javary-class monitor – riverine monitor ordered but never commissioned by Brazil
