= Decree 256/10 =

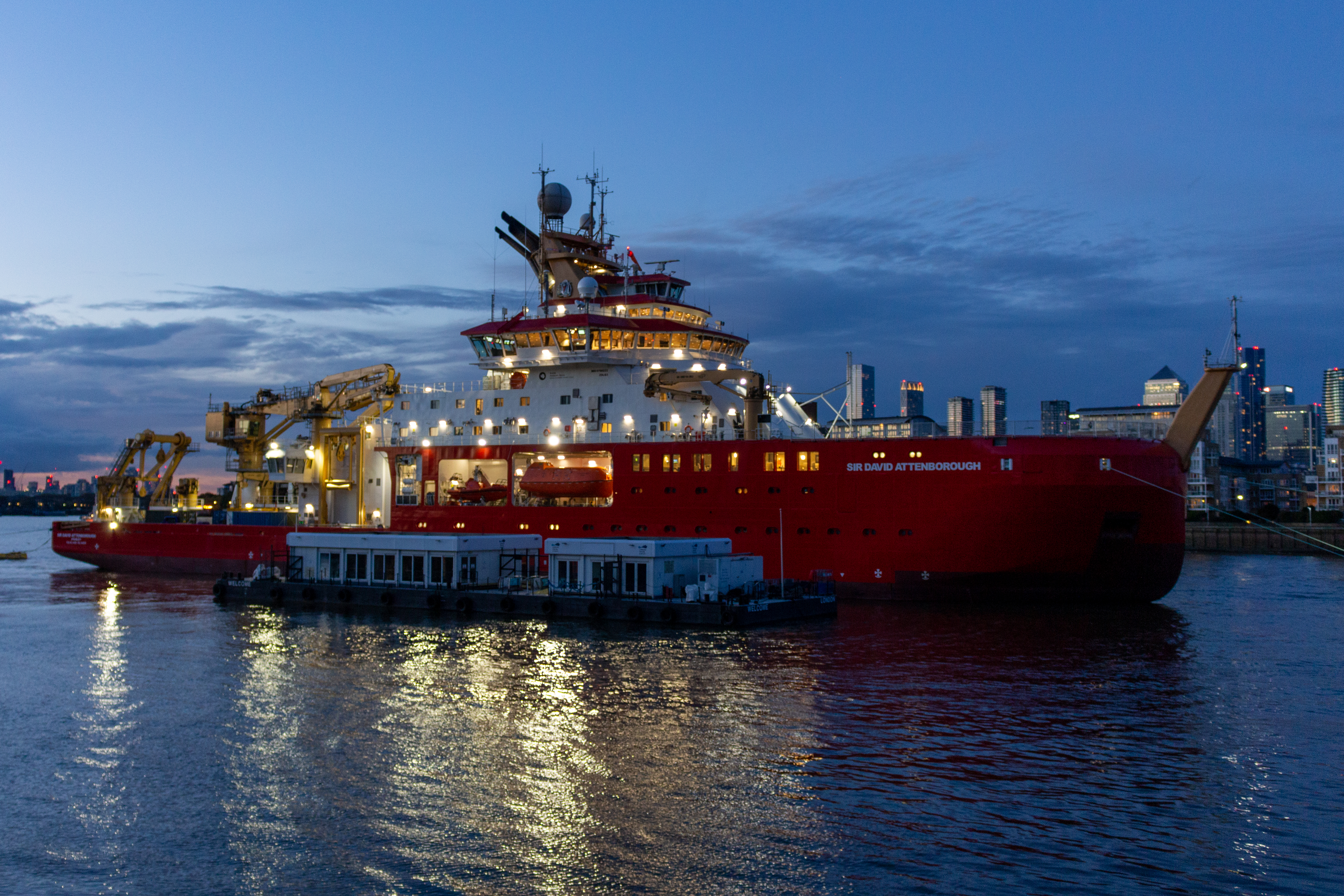
The British scientific research vessel RRS Sir David Attenborough caused a stir in Argentina after entering the Strait of Magellan from the Falkland Islands without requesting authorization in accordance with Decree 256/10.

Decree 256/10 is a regulation issued by the Argentine government on February 16, 2010, which establishes the requirement for all vessels sailing through Argentine jurisdictional waters to or from the Falkland Islands to request prior authorization from Argentine authorities.

== Historical context ==
In the Boundary Treaty of 1881 between Argentina and Chile the Strait of Magellan was recognized as Chilean exclusively, with an obligation of free passing for all nations and no militarization of its shores.

The Falkland Islands sovereignty dispute reached its military peak during the Falklands War in 1982. After the war, Argentina broke off diplomatic relations with the United Kingdom, included the recovery of the islands in the Constitution of Argentina, continued the Cóndor II missile program through the Argentine Air Force, and adopted various other diplomatic and economic measures.

== Article 1 of the decree ==
The first article of the decree states:

Article 1 — Any vessel or naval artifact intending to transit between ports located on the Argentine mainland and ports located in the FALKLAND ISLANDS, SOUTH GEORGIA AND SOUTH SANDWICH ISLANDS, or to cross Argentine jurisdictional waters en route to the latter, and/or load merchandise to be transported directly or indirectly between those ports, must request prior authorization issued by the competent national authority.

This decree contradicts Article 10 of the Treaty of Peace and Friendship between Argentina and Chile of 1984:

...
The Argentine Republic undertakes to maintain, at all times and under all circumstances, the right of vessels of all flags to navigate freely and without obstacles through its jurisdictional waters to and from the Strait of Magellan.
...

== Consequences of the decree ==
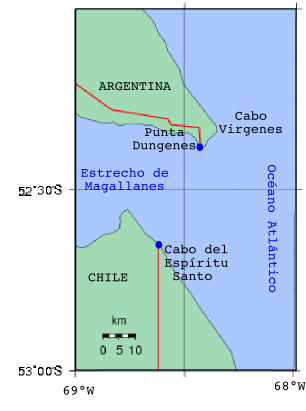
Extreme points of the border between Argentina and Chile at the mouth of the Strait of Magellan. Unconditional access to and from the strait is vital to international navigation interests.

The decree has triggered various international controversies, such as the fine imposed on the Panamanian transport vessel Frío Marathon or the pursuit of the research vessel mentioned above.

However, Argentine scientists argue that the decree constitutes a requirement, not a prohibition.

== See also ==
- Decree 457/2021, an Argentine decree declaring the Strait of Magellan a "shared space" between Argentina and Chile.
