= El Plata-class monitor =

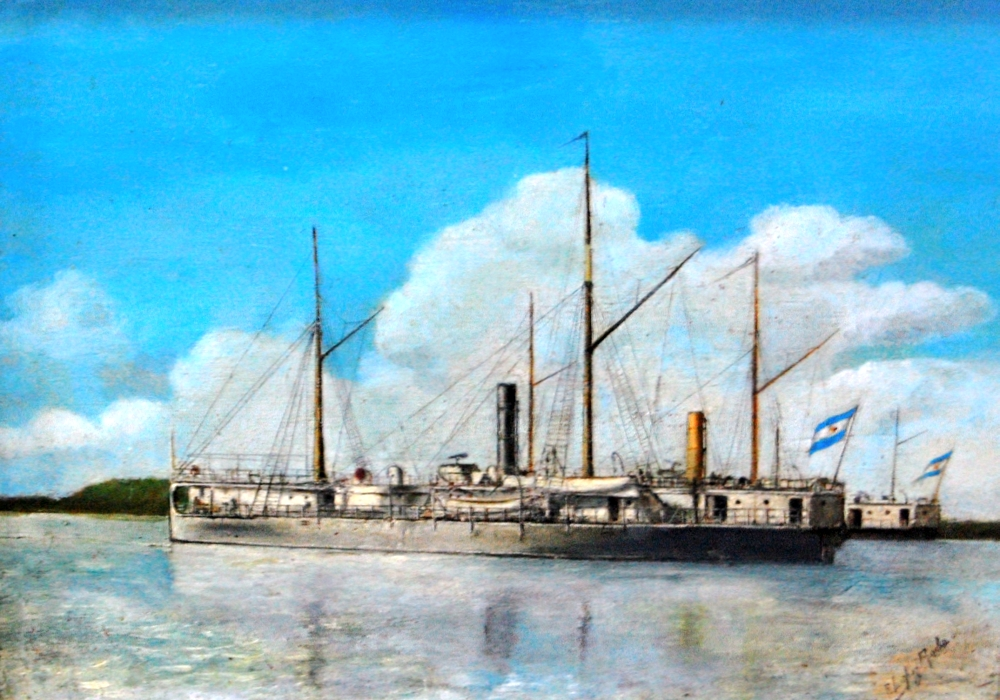
- Watercolor of El Plata

Class overview
- Name: El Plata class
- Builders: Thames Iron Works, Blackwall, London
- Operators: Argentine Navy
- Preceded by: None
- Succeeded by: None
- Built: 1874–1876
- In service: 1875–1927
- Completed: 2
- Scrapped: 2

General characteristics (as built)
- Type: Monitor
- Displacement: 1,535–1,677 long tons (1,560–1,704 t)
- Length: 180 ft (54.9 m) (p/p)
- Beam: 44 ft (13.4 m)
- Draft: 9 ft 1 in (2.8 m)
- Installed power: 750 ihp (560 kW)
- Propulsion: 2 shafts, 2 compound steam engines
- Speed: 9 knots (17 km/h; 10 mph)
- Range: 1,400 nmi (2,600 km; 1,600 mi)
- Complement: 120
- Armament: 2 × 9 in (229 mm) muzzle-loading rifles; 2 × small guns
- Armor: Belt: 4.5–6 in (114–152 mm); Deck: 1 in (25 mm); Gun turret: 8–10 in (203–254 mm)

The El Plata class consisted of a pair of monitors built in Britain in the 1870s for the Argentine Navy. They served as coastal defence ships.

== Description ==
The El Plata-class monitors were 186 feet (56.7 m) long overall, with a beam of 44 feet (13.4 m) and a draft of 9.5–10.5 feet (2.9–3.2 m). They displaced 1,535–1,677 long tons (1,560–1,704 t), and their crew numbered 120 officers and enlisted men.

The ships had two compound steam engines, each driving one propeller shaft, rated at a total power of 750 indicated horsepower (560 kW). This gave them a maximum speed of 9–9.5 knots (16.7–17.6 km/h; 10.4–10.9 mph). They carried 120 long tons (122 t) of coal which gave them a range of approximately 1,400 nautical miles (2,600 km; 1,600 mi).

== Ships in class ==
- ARA El Plata
- ARA Los Andes

== See also ==
- List of ships of the Argentine Navy
- List of ironclads
