= Bouchard-class minesweeper =

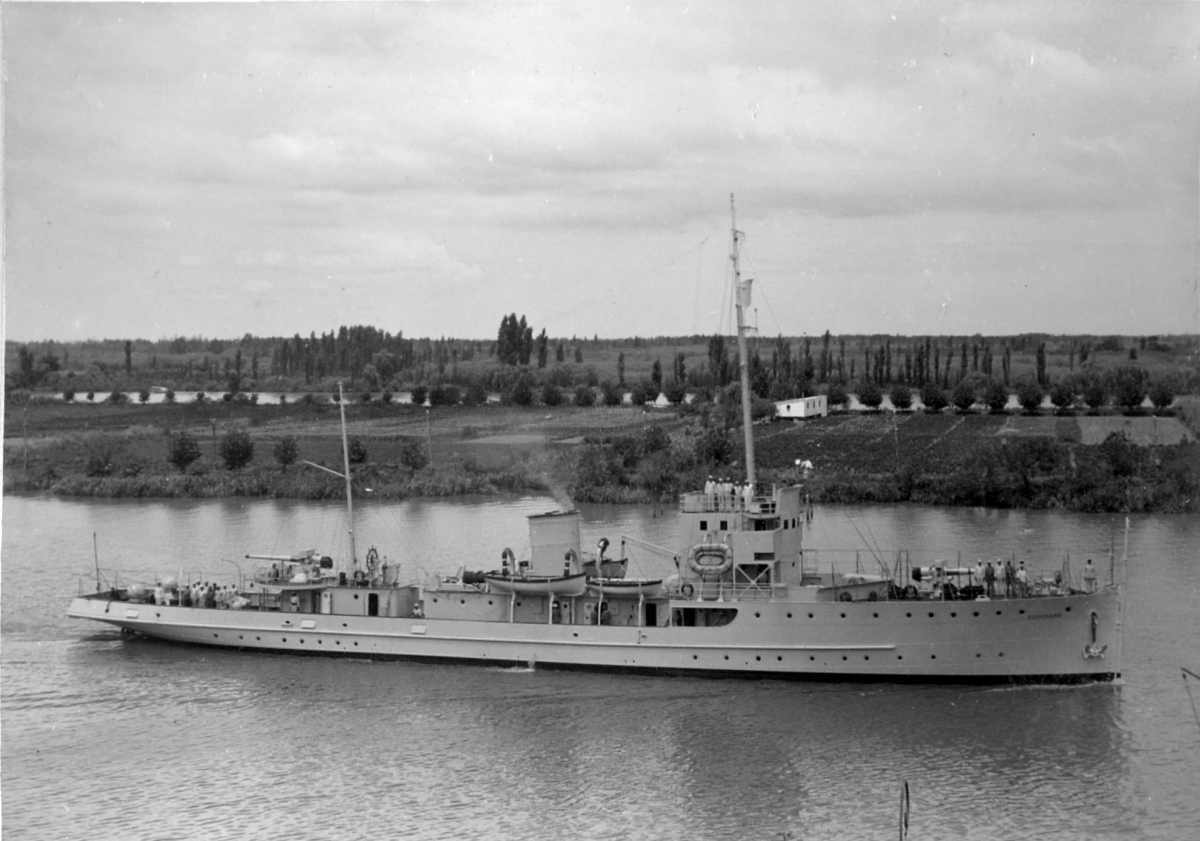
- ARA Bouchard (M-7), circa late 1930s

Class overview
- Name: Bouchard class
- Builders: AFNE Rio Santiago
- Operators: Argentine Navy; Paraguayan Navy
- In commission: 1930s – 1990s
- Completed: 9
- Lost: 1
- Scrapped: 7
- Preserved: 1

General characteristics
- Type: Minesweeper
- Displacement: 450 long tons (457 t) (standard); 520 long tons (528 t) (full load)
- Length: 59.00 m (193 ft 7 in) oa
- Beam: 7.30 m (23 ft 11 in)
- Draught: 2.27 m (7 ft 5 in)
- Propulsion: 2 shafts; 2 × MAN 2-cycle diesel engines, 2,000 bhp (1,500 kW)
- Speed: 15 knots (28 km/h; 17 mph)
- Range: 3,000 nautical miles (5,600 km; 3,500 mi) at 10 knots (19 km/h; 12 mph)
- Endurance: 50 long tons (51 t) fuel oil
- Complement: 62
- Armament: 2 × single 102 mm (4 in) guns; 1 × twin 40 mm (1.6 in) AA guns; 2 × 7.65 mm (0.301 in) Madsen machine guns

The Bouchard-class minesweepers were a class of nine minesweepers, designed and built in Argentina, in service with the Argentine Navy from 1937 to the late 1960s. One of the class was lost after running aground in the Straits of Magellan and the remaining eight were discarded. Three were transferred to the Paraguayan Navy and remained in service as of late 1990s. In Paraguayan service, they were used for river patrol work. One of the class was docked in Asunción in 2009 with the intention of converting the vessel to a museum ship

== Design and description ==
The Bouchard-class minesweepers were the first large warships built in Argentina. They were intended to complement and eventually replace the Argentine Bathurst-class ships purchased from Germany after World War I. They were designed in the early 1930s and laid down in 1935–1937.

The Bouchard class was based on the Bathurst-class design, with diesel engines instead of steam engines and larger calibre (99 mm Bethlehem-Vickers) main armament. However, these ships had poor stability, which eventually led to the loss of Fournier in 1949.

The minesweepers were 59.00 m (193 ft 7 in) long overall and 49.99 m (164 ft 0 in) between perpendiculars with a beam of 7.30 m (23 ft 11 in) and a draught of 2.27 m (7 ft 5 in). The Bouchard class had a standard displacement of 450 long tons (457 t) and 520 long tons (528 t) at full load. They were powered by 2-cycle MAN diesel engines turning two shafts rated at 2,000 brake horsepower (1,500 kW). They had capacity for 50 long tons (51 t) of fuel oil, a maximum speed of 15 knots (28 km/h; 17 mph) and had a range of 3,000 nautical miles (5,600 km; 3,500 mi) at 10 knots (19 km/h; 12 mph). (Note: Chesneau has the maximum speed listed as 16 knots (30 km/h; 18 mph).)

The ships were armed with two single-mounted 99 mm (3.9 in)/47 calibre guns. (Note: The 47 calibre denotes the length of the gun. This means that the length of the gun barrel is 47 times the bore diameter.) For anti-aircraft defence, the minesweepers were equipped with one twin 40 mm (1.6 in) mount. They also carried two 7.65 mm (0.301 in) machine guns and were initially equipped with two depth charges. The Bouchard class had a complement of 62.

== Ships in class ==
Bouchard-class minesweepers
Ship name	Pennant number	Builder	Launched	Service entry	Fate
ARA Bouchard	M-7	Río Santiago Naval Yard	20 March 1936	27 January 1937	Transferred to Paraguay February 1964 and renamed Nanawa.
ARA Drummond	M-2	Río Santiago Naval Yard	19 June 1936	1937	Discarded 28 March 1964
ARA Granville	M-4	Río Santiago Naval Yard	27 January 1937	1937	Discarded 19 December 1967
ARA Parker	M-11	Sanchez Shipyard, San Fernando	2 May 1937	1937	Discarded 23 July 1963
ARA Spiro	M-13	Río Santiago Naval Yard	7 June 1937	1938	Discarded 14 March 1962
ARA Robinson	M-3	Hansen y Puccini, San Fernando	18 August 1938	1939	Discarded 19 December 1967
ARA Seaver	M-12	Hansen y Puccini, San Fernando	18 August 1938	20 May 1939	Discarded 20 November 1967, transferred to Paraguayan Navy and renamed Capitan Meza.
ARA Py (aka Comodoro Py)	M-10	Río Santiago Naval Yard	30 March 1938	1 July 1939	Discarded 20 November 1967, transferred to Paraguayan Navy and renamed Teniente Farina.
ARA Fournier	M-5	Sanchez Shipyard, San Fernando	1939	1940	Hit a reef and sank in the Straits of Magellan on 22 September 1949

== Service history ==
The Bouchard class were all given names of famous Argentine naval commanders. They were commissioned by the Argentine Navy in the late 1930s and remained in service until the late 1960s. The ships in the class were used in exercises with the main fleet, and very frequently assigned to the Patagonian seas where conditions are very rough. The stability problem of this design was worsened in those seas, which eventually led to the loss of Fournier with all hands during a storm in the Straits of Magellan on 22 September 1949. Fournier struck an uncharted rock at the entrance to the San Gabriel Channel.

Three ships were transferred to the Paraguayan Navy after being decommissioned by Argentina, and remained in service as of the late 1990s. The three ships included Bouchard and Seaver, and Py (Note: Some sources erroneously claim it was Parker that was the third ship.) with Bouchard being renamed Nanawa and commissioned into the Paraguayan Navy on 14 March 1964. Seaver became Capitan Meza and commissioned on 6 May 1968. Py became Teniente Farina and commissioned on 6 May 1968. (Note: Nanawa sported the pennant numbers M 1 then P 01, Capitan Meza sported the pennant numbers M 2 then P 02 and Teniente Farina sported the pennant numbers M 3, then P 03.) In Paraguayan service they were used as river patrol craft and could carry naval mines. Their armament was modified to just one quad 40 mm mount and the two machine guns. Teniente Farina was berthed at Asunción in 2009 with the intention of converting the vessel to a museum ship.

== See also ==
- List of ships of the Argentine Navy

== Bibliography ==
- Blackman, Raymond V. B., ed. (1953). Jane's Fighting Ships 1953–54. London: Sampson, Low and Marston. OCLC 913556389.
- Chesneau, Roger, ed. (1980). Conway's All the World's Fighting Ships 1922–1946. Greenwich, UK: Conway Maritime Press. ISBN 0-85177-146-7.
- Gardiner, Robert; Chumbley, Stephen & Budzbon, Przemysław, eds. (1995). Conway's All the World's Fighting Ships 1947–1995. Annapolis, Maryland: Naval Institute Press. ISBN 1-55750-132-7.
- McMurtrie, Francis E., ed. (1943) [1942]. Jane's Fighting Ships 1942. London: Sampson Low, Marston & Co. OCLC 28197961.
- Sharpe, Richard, ed. (1990). Jane's Fighting Ships 1990–91 (93 ed.). Surrey, United Kingdom: Jane's Information Group. ISBN 0-7106-0904-3.
