= ARA La Argentina (1883) =

Steam corvette

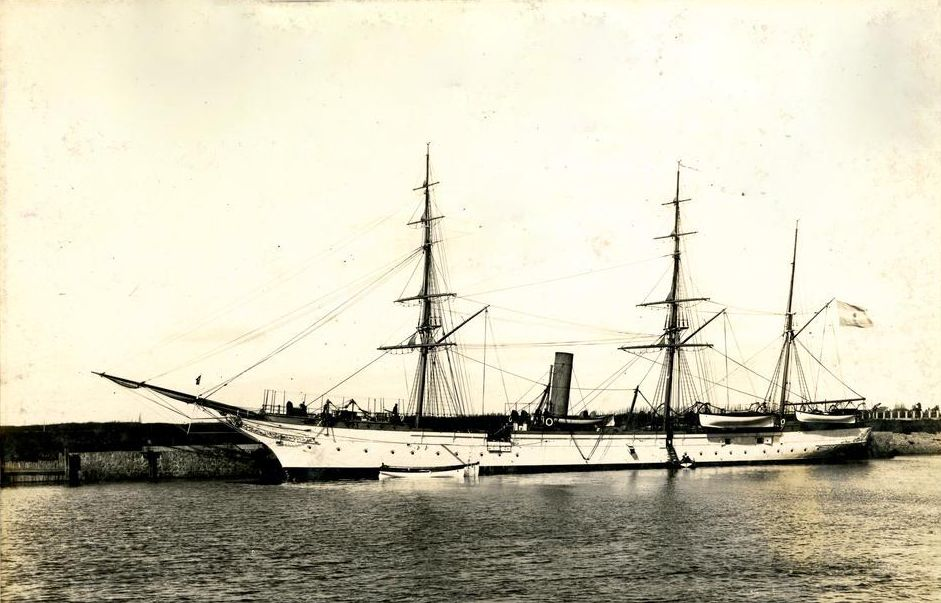
- Corvette ARA La Argentina, circa early 1890s

History

Argentina
- Name: La Argentina
- Namesake: frigate of the same name, under command of Hippolyte Bouchard in the corsair campaign of 1816-19
- Builder: Stabilimento Tecnico Triestino, Trieste, Austro-Hungarian Empire
- Launched: 1883
- Completed: 1884
- Acquired: 1883
- Commissioned: 1884
- Out of service: 1900/1901
- Fate: Scrapped

General characteristics
- Type: steam and sail corvette, used as training ship
- Displacement: 1050 tons
- Length: 69.9 m (229.3 ft)
- Beam: 8.5 m (27.9 ft)
- Draft: 6.0 m (19.7 ft)
- Propulsion: 1-shaft compound steam engine, 750 hp (560 kW), 2 cylindrical boilers, 200 tons coal
- Speed: 12.5 knots (14.4 mph; 23.2 km/h)
- Complement: 120 to 150
- Armament: 1 × 150-millimetre (6 in) Armstrong gun; 4 × 765 mm (30.1 in) Krupp QF guns; 2 × 75 mm (3.0 in) Krupp guns, on landing carriages; 1 × 37mm 5-barrel Hotchkiss gun; 1 × 37mm 4-barrel Hotchkiss gun; 2 Gardner machine guns

ARA La Argentina was a steam corvette that served as a training ship with the Argentine Navy between 1884 and 1895, and in other roles until decommissioned in 1899.

== Design ==
La Argentina was a steam corvette rigged as a barque, with a steel hull covered in wood and copper. It was powered by a 750 HP compound steam engine diving a 2-paddle propeller which could be disengaged when moving exclusively by sail.

Its main armament was one 150mm Armstrong gun and four 76,5mm quick-firing Krupp guns, two per side. The secondary armament was two 37mm quick-fire Hotchkiss guns, one 5-barrel and one 4-barrel; and two 2 Gardner machine guns. It also carried two 75mm guns mounted on carriages used for fighting onshore after landings.

== History ==
Launched in 1883 as a training vessel for the Ottoman Navy, its construction was suspended after the purchase was cancelled. In 1884 is inspected by the Argentine Navy commodore Clodomiro Urtubey who recommends its purchase as training ship for the Escuela Naval Militar. On 24 February 1883 the Argentine representative to Europe, Dr. Miguel Cané, signed a £ 25,000 contract with shipyard Stabilimento Tecnico Triestino, for the completion of the ship under the name La Argentina.

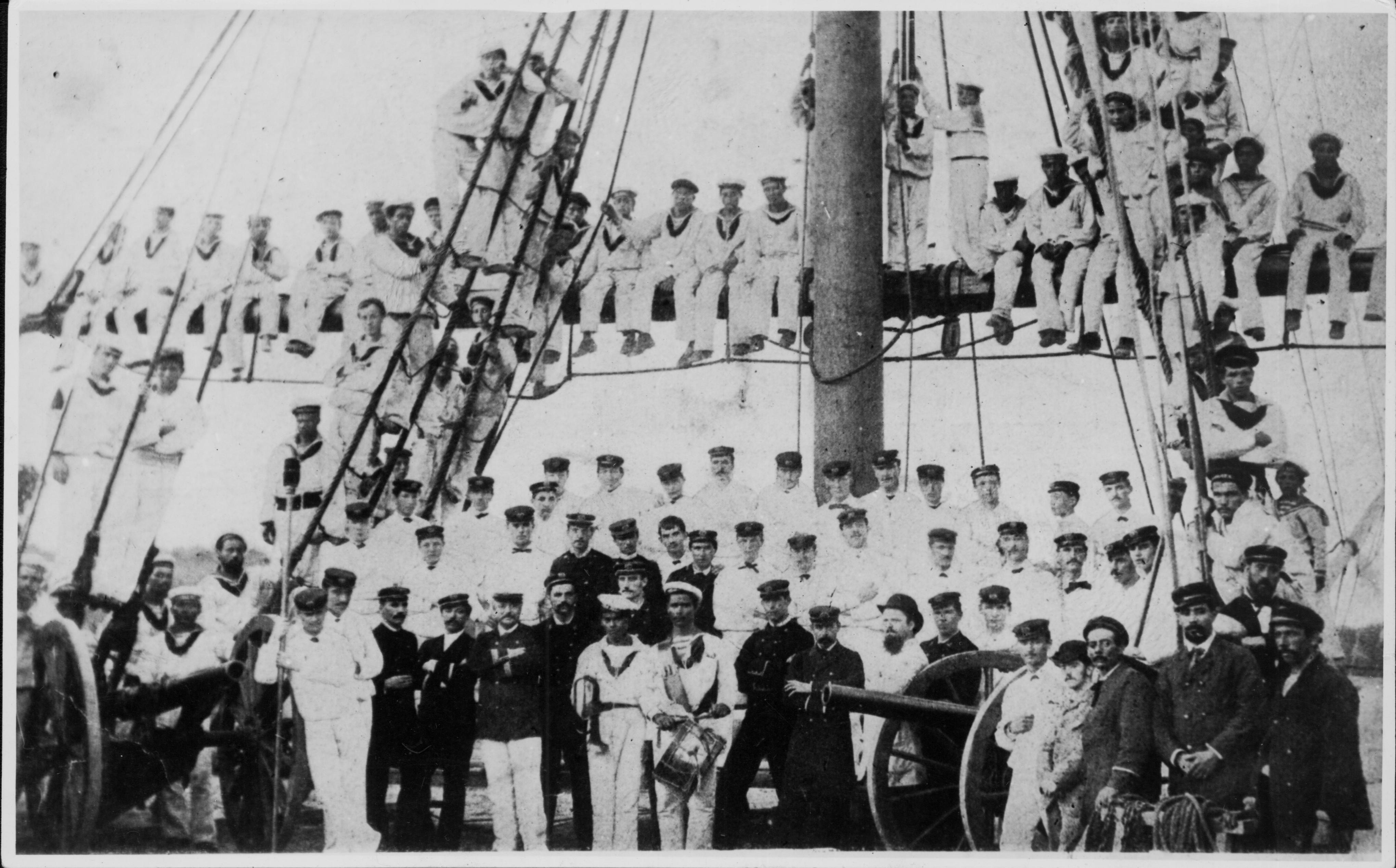
First crew of La Argentina, 1884

Its first commander was Coronel de Marina (Capitán de Navío) Daniel de Solier, who arrived in Trieste on 26 February 1884 with the new ship's crew (including 30 cadets); the ship was still being completed. On 11 May 1884 the ship was handed over to the Argentine Navy and departed from Trieste, arriving in Buenos Aires, Argentina, on 18 October 1884.

Between 1885 and 1888 it was assigned to the Escuela Naval Militar for training of officer cadets. In 1889 it was assigned to the Corvette Division; on 27 November saluted the newly created flag of the Republic of Brazil in Rio de Janeiro, after the Emperor Dom Pedro II was deposed.

In 1890 the ship was assigned again to training duties, and in 1892 sailed to Patagonia carrying supplies.

From 1891 it was noted that is hull was deteriorating, and its activity decreases. In August 1899 it was decommissioned from the Navy.

Between 1901 and 1915 it was assigned as a lightship in front of Quilmes, in that year was sold for scrapping. Its derelict hull was still abandoned in the Riachuelo as late as 1928.

La Argentina sailed 5 training cruises with cadets of the Argentine Navy Academy, until being replaced by the steam frigate ARA Presidente Sarmiento in 1897.

== See also ==
- List of ships of the Argentine Navy
