= José Matías Zapiola =

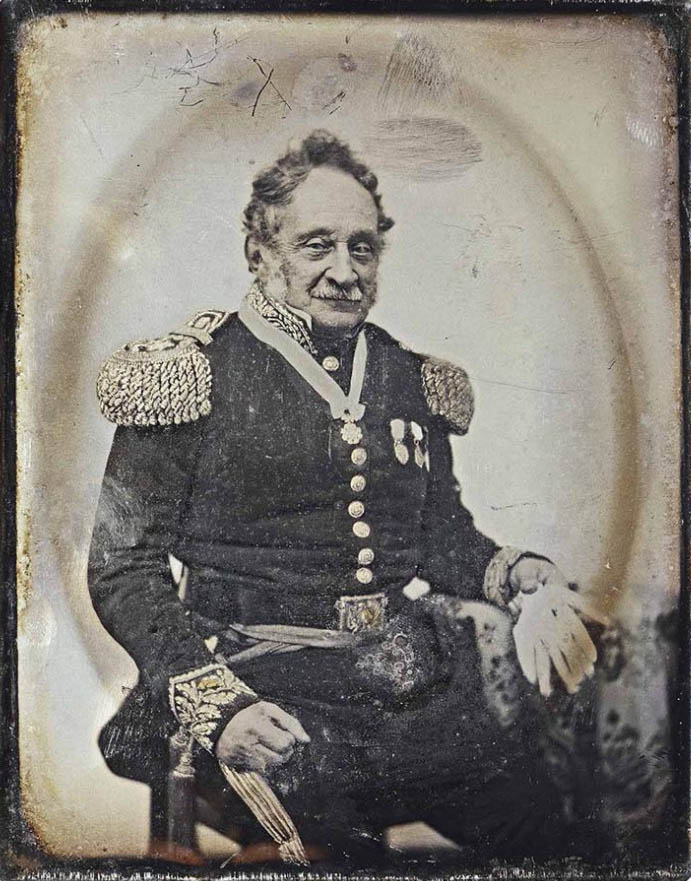
Daguerreotype of Zapiola, c. 1840–60.

José Matías Zapiola (March 22, 1780 - June 27, 1874) was an Argentine brigadier. He was born in Buenos Aires on March 22, 1780. He moved to Spain, and returned alongside José de San Martín in 1812.

From 1812 to 1814, he took part in the siege of Montevideo and fought in the battles of Chacabuco in 1817 and Maipu in 1818. He retired in 1829 but was the Minister of War for Buenos Aires in 1859.

He was probably one of the last living veterans of the Argentine War of Independence, though the naval commander José María Pinedo (1795-1885) lived well into the 1880s having enlisted in the Navy in 1816, though he never participated of any combat during the war.
