= ARA Fournier =

Argentine Navy Minesweeper, sunk in 1949

Coordinates: 54°06′26″S 70°57′21″W

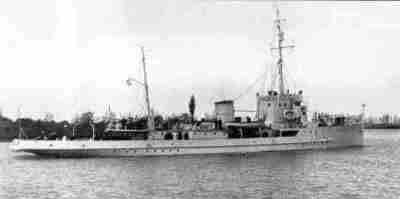
- Stern quarter view of ARA Fournier

History

Argentina
- Name: Fournier
- Namesake: César Fournier, an Italian-Argentine privateer during the Cisplatine War
- Builder: Sanchez Shipyard, San Fernando
- Launched: 1939
- Commissioned: 1940
- Identification: Pennant number M-5
- Fate: Capsized in a gale and sank, 22 September 1949

General characteristics
- Class & type: Bouchard-class minesweeper
- Displacement: 450 long tons (457 t) (standard); 520 long tons (528 t) (full load)
- Length: 59.00 m (193 ft 7 in) oa
- Beam: 7.30 m (23 ft 11 in)
- Draught: 2.27 m (7 ft 5 in)
- Propulsion: 2 shafts; 2 × MAN 2-cycle diesel engines, 2,000 bhp (1,500 kW)
- Speed: 15 knots (28 km/h; 17 mph)
- Range: 3,000 nautical miles (5,600 km; 3,500 mi) at 10 knots (19 km/h; 12 mph)
- Endurance: 50 long tons (51 t) fuel oil
- Complement: 62
- Armament: 2 × single 99 mm (3.9 in) guns; 1 × twin 40 mm (1.6 in) AA guns; 2 × 7.65 mm (0.301 in) machine guns

ARA Fournier (M-5) was a Bouchard-class minesweeper of the Argentine Navy. As the rest of her class, Fournier was basically designed for coastal or riverine service; notwithstanding, the Argentine Navy deployed the Bouchards to the South Atlantic in patrol and resupply missions, The weight of her armament and the low upper works resulted in the ships' instability in open seas. Fournier was in service from 1940 until her sinking during a gale in 1949 while crossing from the Atlantic to the Pacific through the Magellan Straits, with heavy loss of life.

== Design and description ==
The Bouchard-class minesweepers were the first large warships built in Argentina. They were intended to complement and eventually replace the Argentine Bathurst-class ships purchased from Germany after World War I. The Bouchard class was based on the Bathurst-class design, with diesel engines instead of steam engines and larger calibre main armament. Mainly as a consequence of her heavy armament, the ships had poor stability, which eventually led to the loss of Fournier in 1949.

The minesweepers were 59.00 m (193 ft 7 in) long overall and 49.99 m (164 ft 0 in) between perpendiculars with a beam of 7.30 m (23 ft 11 in) and a draught of 2.27 m (7 ft 5 in). The Bouchard class had a standard displacement of 450 long tons (457 t) and 520 long tons (528 t) at full load. They were powered by 2-cycle MAN diesel engines turning two shafts rated at 2,000 brake horsepower (1,500 kW). They had a capacity for 50 long tons (51 t) of fuel oil, a maximum speed of 15 knots (28 km/h; 17 mph), and had a range of 3,000 nautical miles (5,600 km; 3,500 mi) at 10 knots (19 km/h; 12 mph). (Note: Chesneau has the maximum speed listed as 16 knots (30 km/h; 18 mph).)

The ships were armed with two single-mounted 99 mm (3.9 in)/47 calibre guns. (Note: The 47 calibre denotes the length of the gun. This means that the length of the gun barrel is 47 times the bore diameter.) For anti-aircraft defence, the minesweepers were equipped with one twin 40 mm (1.6 in) mount. They also carried two 7.65 mm (0.301 in) machine guns and were initially equipped with two depth charges. The Bouchard class usually had a complement of 62.

== Service history ==
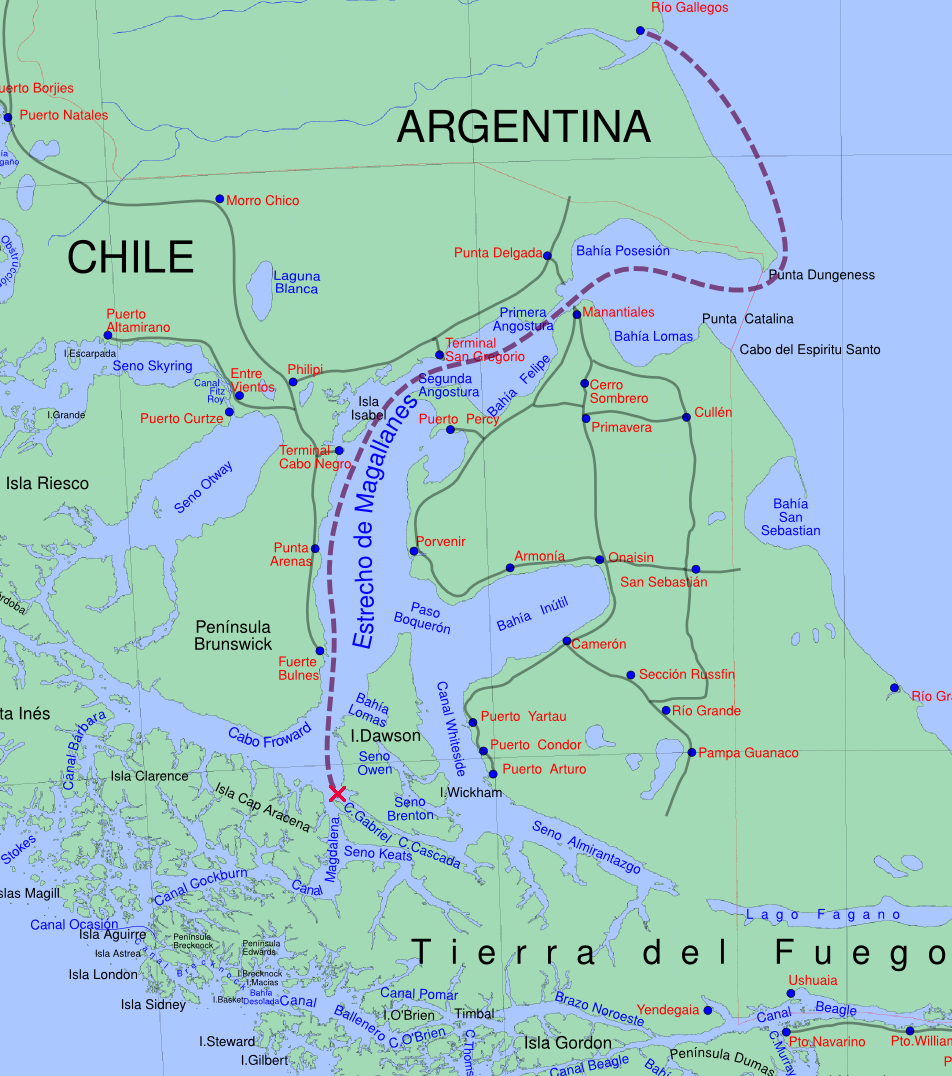
Last voyage of Fournier

Fournier was built at the Sánchez shipyard in San Fernando. She was launched in 1939, and handed over from the shipyard on 13 October 1940.

The port of call of Fournier was Puerto Belgrano naval base, where she served in the Mine Warfare Squadron. Fournier joined the Antarctic campaigns of 1943 and 1944, annual expeditions to the Antarctic Peninsula carried out by the Argentine Navy. In the course of these missions, Fournier rescued the tugboat Olco and the Chilean sailboat Condor. Since 1948, the ship was part of the División Rastreadores de la Zona Marítima (Minesweeper Oceanic Division). The following year, Fournier was assigned to Ushuaia naval base. Her mission was to supply provisions and mail to lighthouses and small settlements along the Beagle Channel, patrol jurisdictional waters and search for illegal fishing and hunting. In April 1949, six months before her sinking, Fournier assisted a submarine which had run aground at Mar del Plata naval base. It's reported that on this occasion the minesweeper tilted dangerously.

=== Sinking ===
On 17 September 1949 Fournier reached Rio Gallegos in a round trip from Ushuaia, carrying doctor Raul Wernicke and his son on a scientific expedition through the Fuegian channels. On 21 September, on her way back, the ship departed Río Gallegos for Ushuaia through the Magellan Straits: most of the journey would be across Chilean waters. Fournier radioed a message to Ushuaia at 4:30 pm and would never make contact again. A massive search and rescue operation was launched on 23 September when the ship failed to arrive, led by Fournier's sister ship ARA Spiro. The Chilean Navy Sotoyomo-class tugboat Lautaro joined the search after Chilean authorities were put on alert by the Argentine Navy.

On 3 October floating debris was spotted by a Chilean Air Force A-24 Banshee reconnaissance aircraft off Punta Cono, southwest of Dawson Island. The Argentine transport ships Bahía Blanca and Sanavirón were immediately dispatched to the area, where they found a boat, a lifejacket and later the body of a crewmember of Fournier. Following a tip from a local fisherman, the Spiro recovered two more bodies at Caleta Zig-Zag, a cove adjacent to Punta Cono. The man, a half-Alacaluf who resided in the island, had buried the remains on a beach after finding a lifeboat with the dead seamen aboard. The Lautaro, sweeping the same zone, found another lifeboat with the bodies of Fournier's commander, the second in command and three non-commissioned officers aboard. Sometime later a Chilean Catalina flying boat found a patch of oil in what was the probable spot where the Fournier sank. The hour of sinking was established from the wrist watches of the rescued bodies, all of which struck 5:25 pm.

At first, it was believed that Fournier sank on or around 22 September, apparently after striking a rock about 60 nautical miles (110 km) south of Punta Arenas, but experts eventually concluded that the ship had capsized in rough sea after being hit by a northwesterly storm. All hands on board, initially reported as 60 but later ascertained to be 77, including doctor Wernicke and his son, were lost. Only nine bodies were recovered found either in Caleta Zig-Zag or near the mouth of Canal Gabriel, a channel south of Dawson Island. The sinking of Fournier was publicly announced on 4 October.

The bodies of the deceased sailors were received by a mourning crowd at the port of Buenos Aires, where they arrived transported by the frigate ARA Heroína. The funeral rites took place at the Navy Mechanics School.

According to various sources, although the ship sank with all hands, two of the Fournier's crewmembers survived because they were not on board at the time of the incident. José Aristir Juan, the ship's electrician, had been left ashore due to a sinus infection. It's also been reported that Ismael Castro, a telegraph operator, was similarly disembarked for an undisclosed illness. Later in life, Juan wrote a book about his experiences aboard the Fournier. Castro, who later became a photographer for a newspaper in his hometown of Tres Arroyos, died while covering a Turismo Carretera race in the town of Nueve de Julio on 22 July 1984, after a racing car spun out and hit him.

The loss of Fournier stirred controversy between Argentina and Chile over the unannounced passage of Argentine Navy vessels through Chilean territorial waters, a usual practice long before Fournier's sinking. The Argentines often took the western route to Ushuaia to avoid the more dangerous eastern journey on the open sea. The Chilean government, due to the dispute, declined the Argentine invitation to the funeral extended to the Chilean crews involved in the rescue: they were instead received and decorated by the Argentine government at the Argentine embassy in Santiago de Chile.

On 24 October 1949, barely one month after the loss of Fournier, a street in Mar del Plata was named Tripulantes del Fournier in hommage to the ship's crew.

== See also ==
- ARA San Juan
- SMS M85

== Bibliography ==
- Blackman, Raymond V. B., ed. (1953). Jane's Fighting Ships 1953–54. London: Sampson, Low and Marston. OCLC 913556389.
- Chesneau, Roger, ed. (1980). Conway's All the World's Fighting Ships 1922–1946. Greenwich, UK: Conway Maritime Press. ISBN 0-85177-146-7.
- McMurtrie, Francis E., ed. (1943) [1942]. Jane's Fighting Ships 1942. London: Sampson Low, Marston & Co. OCLC 28197961.
- Nash, Jay Robert (1976). Darkest Hours: A Narrative Encyclopedia of Worldwide Disasters From Ancient Times to the Present. Lanham, Maryland: Rowman & Littlefield. ISBN 978-1-59077-526-4.
