= ARA Luisito =

History

Argentina
- Name: Luisito
- Namesake: Cutter built by Luis Piedrabuena
- Owner: Argentine Navy
- Acquired: 1983
- Commissioned: 1985
- Home port: Mar del Plata
- Status: Active

General characteristics
- Type: Training ship

ARA Luisito (Q-51) is a training ship of the Argentine Navy, in service since 1985 and based in Mar del Plata; where she is used to train students from Argentina's National Fishing School. The vessel is the first Argentine naval ship with this name.

== Design ==
Luisito is a fishing trawler built in Japan. She has a single mast on top of the superstructure, and a crane on her stern to haul the fishing net.

The ship can only use the trawling fishing method.

== History ==
Luisito was donated by Japan in 1983 to the National Fishing School (Spanish: Escuela Nacional de Pesca) "Comandante Luis Piedrabuena", which depends from the Argentine Navy. The donation was part of a Technological Cooperation Agreement between the governments of Argentina and Japan, to be used in applying the theoretical concepts learned in class.

In 2008 it was intended to repair her, however the required budget was not allocated.

In May 2024 Luisito underwent a major overhaul at SPI shipyards in Mar del Plata.

== See also ==
- List of active Argentine Navy ships
- List of auxiliary ships of the Argentine Navy
