= ARA La Plata =

Argentine destroyer

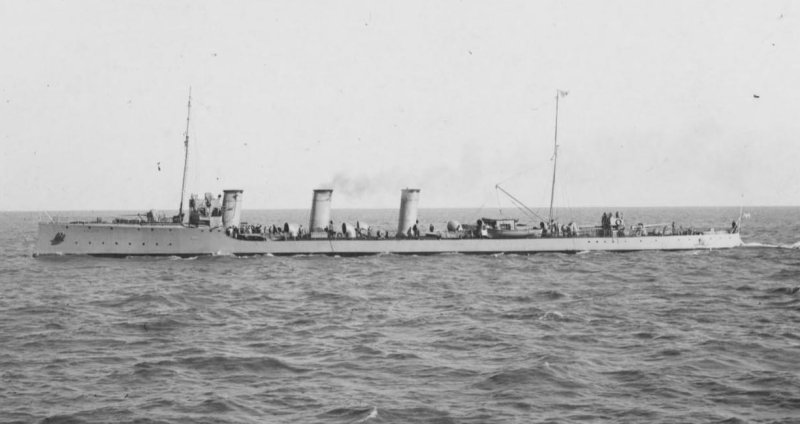
- La Plata in 1914

History

Argentina
- Name: La Plata
- Namesake: La Plata
- Ordered: 1910
- Builder: Schichau-Werke, Elbing
- Cost: £124,360
- Launched: 1911
- Commissioned: 30 March 1912
- Out of service: 1955
- Stricken: 10 January 1957
- Identification: Pennant number: D-1

General characteristics
- Type: Torpedo boat destroyer
- Displacement: Normal: 875 long tons (889 t); Full load: 1,368 long tons (1,390 t)
- Length: 295 ft 3 in (90.0 m)
- Beam: 29 ft 6 in (9.0 m)
- Draft: 16 ft 5 in (5.0 m)
- Installed power: 28,000 shp (21,000 kW)
- Propulsion: 2 steam turbines; 5 boilers; 2 propellers
- Speed: 35 knots (65 km/h; 40 mph)
- Range: 3,000 nmi (5,600 km; 3,500 mi) at 15 knots (28 km/h; 17 mph)
- Complement: 150
- Armament: 4 × 102 mm (4.0 in) main guns; 2 × 37 mm (1.5 in) anti-aircraft guns; 4 × 533 mm (21.0 in) torpedo tubes

ARA La Plata was the lead La Plata-class destroyer of the Argentine Navy. She was ordered in 1910 to keep pace with the Brazilian Navy and commissioned in 1912. She primarily operated as a torpedo boat, scout, and training ship for the next four decades. By 1955, the Navy had no use for the old ship and she was stricken two years later.

== Development and design ==
In 1910, Argentina ordered a dozen torpedo boat destroyers in response to a major expansion of the Brazilian Navy. As the nation lacked a major shipbuilding industry, it ordered the ships from experienced foreign shipyards in Europe. Only the four built in Germany were ultimately operated by Argentina, with the order equally split between two shipyards. The pair ordered from Schichau-Werke in Elbing were known as the La Plata-class destroyers. The two destroyers—La Plata and her sister ship Cordoba—had an overall length of 295 feet 3 inches (90.0 m) with a beam of 29 feet 6 inches (9.0 m) and a maximum draught of 16 feet 5 inches (5.0 m). They displaced 875 long tons (889 t) at normal load and 1,368 long tons (1,390 t) at full load and carried a complement of 150. Propulsion was provided by two propellers powered by Curtis AEG steam turbines supplied by five Schulz-Thornycroft boilers, which produced 28,000 shaft horsepower (21,000 kW) and a maximum speed of 35 knots (65 km/h; 40 mph). The destroyers carried 290 long tons (295 t) of coal and 50 long tons (51 t) of fuel oil, which enabled a range of 3,000 nautical miles (5,600 km; 3,500 mi) at 15 knots (28 km/h; 17 mph). Armament consisted of four 102 mm (4.0 in) caliber main guns, two 37 mm (1.5 in) anti-aircraft guns, and four 533 mm (21.0 in) torpedo tubes. The design featured three funnels and cost £124,360 per ship.

== Service history ==
La Plata was launched in 1911 and commissioned on 30 March 1912. During speed trials, she reached a top speed of 36.8 knots (68.2 km/h; 42.3 mph). She was named after the city of La Plata and assigned the pennant number D-4. The destroyer reached Argentina in July and was initially assigned to the Scout-Torpedo Boat Group (Grupo de Exploradores-Torpederas) and patrolled off Mar del Plata. Between 1912 and 1927, she would be intermittently placed in and out of commission, assigned to the training division or Scout-Torpedo Boat Group, and preformed exercises with other Argentine warships along the coast. Between 1927 and 1935, the destroyer was modernized by the Brazilian Navy Arsenal, which included converting the ship to burn fuel oil. She returned to service in 1935, and proceeded to operate with torpedo boat and reconnaissance squadrons before she was assigned to the river squadron in 1941. Five years later, she was transferred to the Río de la Plata Naval Force's torpedo boat division and became the flagship briefly, before she was again modernized between 1947 and 1951. She was reused as a training ship between 1951 and 1955; that year, the Navy had no use for the old destroyer and placed her in reserve. Due to administrative issues slowing the process, she was stricken on 10 January 1957.
