= ARA Zurubí =

Argentine navy patrol boat

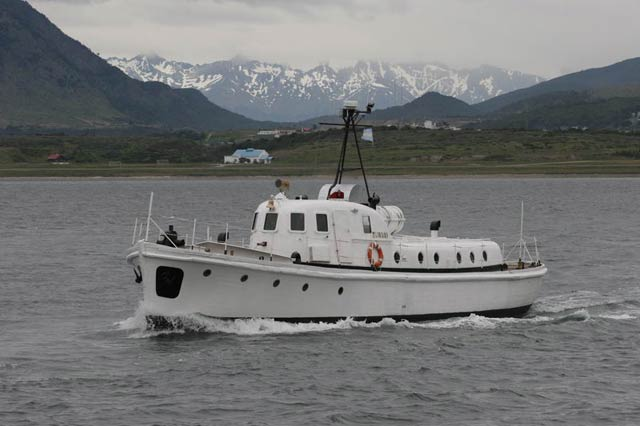
- Argentinian patrol boat Zurubí

History

Argentina
- Name: Zurubí
- Namesake: Surubí, a fish from Argentina’s Mesopotamia rivers.
- Builder: Río Santiago Shipyard, Argentina
- Laid down: 1938
- Commissioned: 1939
- Recommissioned: 1993
- Decommissioned: 1985
- Home port: Ushuaia
- Status: Active
- Notes: Initially in service with the Argentine Naval Prefecture

General characteristics
- Type: Patrol boat
- Displacement: 33 tons
- Length: 22 m (72.2 ft)
- Beam: 4.2 m (13.8 ft)
- Draft: 1.4 m (4.6 ft)
- Propulsion: 2-shaft, 2 × Deutz MWM diesel engines
- Speed: 10 knots (12 mph; 19 km/h)
- Complement: 4 (1 officer)
- Armament: none
- Notes: Career and characteristics data from “Histarmar” and “Argentine Navy” websites.

ARA Zurubí (P-55) is a patrol boat of the Argentine Navy, built in the Río Santiago Shipyard in 1938 and based in Ushuaia. The vessel is named after the Surubí, a catfish that inhabits Argentina's Mesopotamia, and is the first Argentine naval ship with this name.

== Design ==
Zurubí is a coastal and fluvial patrol boat designed by the engineering team at Río Santiago Shipyard, where it was built. It has a wooden hull and superstructure, and a tripod mast.

It is powered by two 8-cylinder “Deutz” V-diesel engines driving two propellers; which replaced the original “GM” ones.

It is equipped with VHF radio, navigation radar, echo-sounding device, and compass.

== History ==
Zurubí was ordered in 1938 by the Argentine General Prefecture (PGA), predecessor of the Argentine Naval Prefecture (PNA), as a pilot boat, and was built in the Río Santiago Shipyard, in Buenos Aires, Argentina, at a cost of 111,982 Argentine pesos; a sister ship, the current PNA Dorado (GC-101) was also ordered. Commissioned by the PGA in 1939, she was assigned to the pilot service in the port of Bahía Blanca.

Zurubí was transferred in early 1944 to the Argentine Navy as a patrol boat with pennant number P-36, and modified in the Río Santiago Shipyard. It was assigned to the Ushuaia naval base to patrol the local waters, arriving in that city in June 1944. It performed various duties until 1985, when Zurubí was decommissioned.

=== Back into service ===
The historic importance of Zurubí to the local population motivated the Tierra del Fuego government to request the Argentine Navy to preserve the vessel. As a result, Zurubí was refurbished and re-commissioned in 1993. As of early 2016, Zurubí is in active service based still in Ushuaia.

Zurubí is also notable as the first Argentine Navy ship with a female commander: in 2009 Guardiamarina (Midshipman) Erica Vanessa Bibbó was appointed skipper of the historic vessel.

== See also ==
- List of active Argentine Navy ships
- List of ships of the Argentine Navy
