= La Plata-class destroyer =

Argentine destroyer class

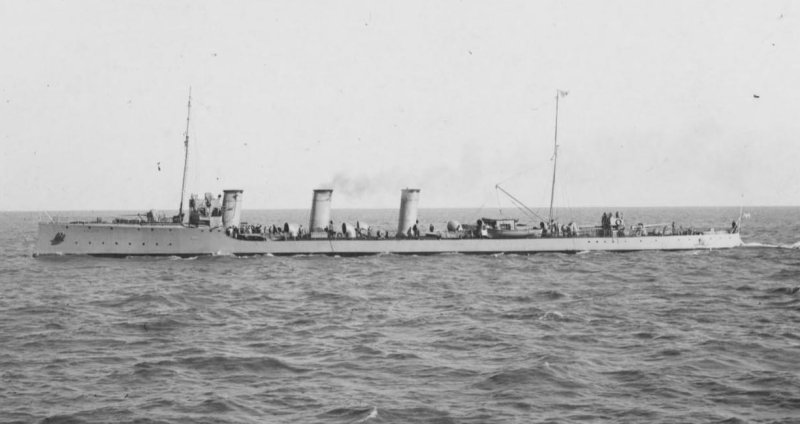
- Lead of her class La Plata in 1914

Class overview
- Name: La Plata class
- Builders: Schichau-Werke, Elbing
- Operators: Argentine Navy
- Built: 1911–1912
- In service: 1911–1957
- Completed: 2
- Scrapped: 2

General characteristics
- Type: Torpedo boat destroyer
- Displacement: Normal: 875 long tons (889 t); Full load: 1,368 long tons (1,390 t)
- Length: 295 ft 3 in (90.0 m)
- Beam: 29 ft 6 in (9.0 m)
- Draft: 16 ft 5 in (5.0 m)
- Installed power: 28,000 shp (21,000 kW)
- Propulsion: 2 steam turbines; 5 boilers; 2 propellers
- Speed: 35 knots (65 km/h; 40 mph)
- Range: 3,000 nmi (5,600 km; 3,500 mi) at 15 knots (28 km/h; 17 mph)
- Complement: 150
- Armament: 4 × 102 mm (4.0 in) main guns; 2 × 37 mm (1.5 in) anti-aircraft guns; 4 × 533 mm (21.0 in) torpedo tubes

The La Plata class was a pair of torpedo boat destroyers operated by the Argentine Navy between 1911 and 1957. Ordered from a German shipyard as part of a larger effort to expand the Navy, the two ships had an uneventful service life throughout World War I, World War II, and the early Cold War.

== Development and design ==
In 1910, Argentina ordered a dozen torpedo boat destroyers in response to a major expansion of the Brazilian Navy. As the nation lacked a major shipbuilding industry, it ordered the ships from experienced foreign shipyards in Europe. All twelve featured a similar design and identical armament. The four destroyers built in France were requisitioned by the French Navy start of World War I and operated as the Aventurier class, and the four built in the United Kingdom were purchased by the Greek Navy in 1912 as the and served as the Aetos class. Only the four built in Germany reached Argentina, with the order equally split between two shipyards. Those ordered from Schichau-Werke in Elbing were named La Plata and Cordoba. The two destroyers had an overall length of 295 feet 3 inches (90.0 m) with a beam of 29 feet 6 inches (9.0 m) and a maximum draught of 16 feet 5 inches (5.0 m). They displaced 875 long tons (889 t) at normal load and 1,368 long tons (1,390 t) at full load and carried a complement of 150. Propulsion was provided by two propellers powered by Curtis AEG steam turbines supplied by five Schulz-Thornycroft boilers, which produced 28,000 shaft horsepower (21,000 kW) and a maximum speed of 35 knots (65 km/h; 40 mph). The destroyers carried 290 long tons (295 t) of coal and 50 long tons (51 t) of fuel oil, which enabled a range of 3,000 nautical miles (5,600 km; 3,500 mi) at 15 knots (28 km/h; 17 mph). Armament consisted of four 102 mm (4.0 in) caliber main guns, two 37 mm (1.5 in) anti-aircraft guns, and four 533 mm (21.0 in) torpedo tubes. The design featured three funnels and cost £124,360.

== Service history ==
Both ships were completed in 1912. During the speed trials, La Plata reached 36.8 knots (68.2 km/h; 42.3 mph) and Cordoba 34.7 knots (64.3 km/h; 39.9 mph). As World War I disrupted the Navy's ability to procure warships in Europe, the La Plata-class made up half the Argentine destroyer fleet until 1927. By the mid 1950s, the Navy acquired American destroyers built during World War II, and the duo were decommissioned by 1957.

== Ships in class ==
Data
Name	Launched	Completed	Fate
La Plata	1911	30 March 1912	Stricken 10 January 1957
Cordoba	1912	8 July 1912	Stricken 10 January 1956
