= ARA Cordoba =

Argentine destroyer

History

Argentina
- Name: Cordoba
- Namesake: Córdoba Province, Argentina
- Ordered: 1910
- Builder: Schichau-Werke, Elbing
- Cost: £124,360
- Launched: 1911
- Commissioned: 8 July 1912
- Out of service: 1947
- Stricken: 10 January 1956
- Identification: Pennant number: D-2

General characteristics
- Type: Torpedo boat destroyer
- Displacement: Normal: 875 long tons (889 t); Full load: 1,368 long tons (1,390 t)
- Length: 295 ft 3 in (90.0 m)
- Beam: 29 ft 6 in (9.0 m)
- Draft: 16 ft 5 in (5.0 m)
- Installed power: 28,000 shp (21,000 kW)
- Propulsion: 2 steam turbines; 5 boilers; 2 propellers
- Speed: 34.7 knots (64.3 km/h; 39.9 mph)
- Range: 3,000 nmi (5,600 km; 3,500 mi) at 15 knots (28 km/h; 17 mph)
- Complement: 150
- Armament: 4 × 102 mm (4.0 in) main guns; 2 × 37 mm (1.5 in) anti-aircraft guns; 4 × 533 mm (21.0 in) torpedo tubes

ARA Cordoba (also written as Córdoba) was the second and last La Plata-class destroyer of the Argentine Navy. She was ordered in 1910 to keep pace with the Brazilian Navy and commissioned in 1912. She primarily operated as a scout and training ship for the next four decades. She was placed in reserve in 1947 and decommissioned in 1956.

== Development and design ==
In 1910, Argentina ordered a dozen torpedo boat destroyers in response to a major expansion of the Brazilian Navy. As the nation lacked a major shipbuilding industry, it ordered the ships from experienced foreign shipyards in Europe. Only the four built in Germany were ultimately operated by Argentina, with the order equally split between two shipyards. The pair ordered from Schichau-Werke in Elbing were known as the La Plata-class destroyers. The two destroyers—La Plata and Cordoba—had an overall length of 295 feet 3 inches (90.0 m) with a beam of 29 feet 6 inches (9.0 m) and a maximum draught of 16 feet 5 inches (5.0 m). They displaced 875 long tons (889 t) at normal load and 1,368 long tons (1,390 t) at full load and carried a complement of 150. Propulsion was provided by two propellers powered by Curtis AEG steam turbines supplied by five Schulz-Thornycroft boilers, which produced 28,000 shaft horsepower (21,000 kW) and a maximum speed of 35 knots (65 km/h; 40 mph). The destroyers carried 290 long tons (295 t) of coal and 50 long tons (51 t) of fuel oil, which enabled a range of 3,000 nautical miles (5,600 km; 3,500 mi) at 15 knots (28 km/h; 17 mph). Armament consisted of four 102 mm (4.0 in) caliber main guns, two 37 mm (1.5 in) anti-aircraft guns, and four 533 mm (21.0 in) torpedo tubes. The design featured three funnels and cost £124,360 per ship.

== Service history ==
Cordoba was launched in 1912 and commissioned on 8 July 1912. During speed trials, the ship reached a top speed of 34.7 knots (64.3 km/h; 39.9 mph). She was named after the Argentine Córdoba Province and assigned the pennant number D-2. The destroyer arrived in Argentina three days before her commissioning, and was assigned to the Training Division and patrolled the Río de la Plata to train sailors slated to operate Rivadavia-class battleships that were under construction. In 1916, she was assigned to the Exploration Division (División de Exploración) and operated as a scout, although World War I-related fuel shortages limited operations and she undertook only one voyage in 1917 and none in 1918. For the next three years, she went back out to sea for fleet-wide training exercises in Río de la Plata; this was interrupted in 1920 when the destroyer visited Concepción del Uruguay and Paraná to recognize the anniversary of Justo José de Urquiza's death. Between 1921 and 1927, she was decommissioned and modernized to burn fuel oil and equipped with British torpedo launchers, among other changes. Returned to service in 1928, she spent the next two decades operating in the Río de la Plata with several fleets. In 1947, she was placed in reserve and decommissioned on 10 January 1956 to be scrapped.
