= Cape Espíritu Santo =

Northeasternmost point of Samar, Philippines

Cape Espiritu Santo Magsasanga (16th century)
- Cape
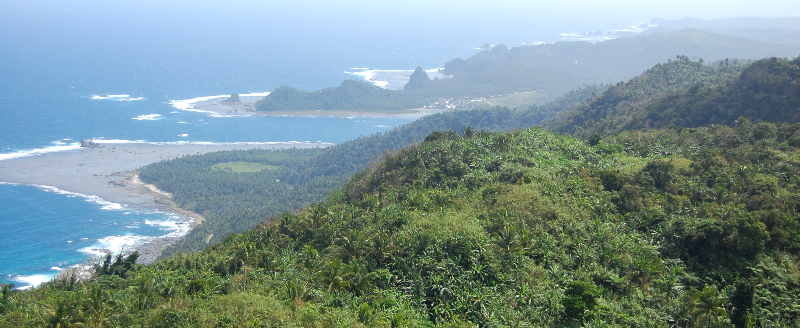
- View of Cape Espiritu Santo or the Northeastern tip of Samar island

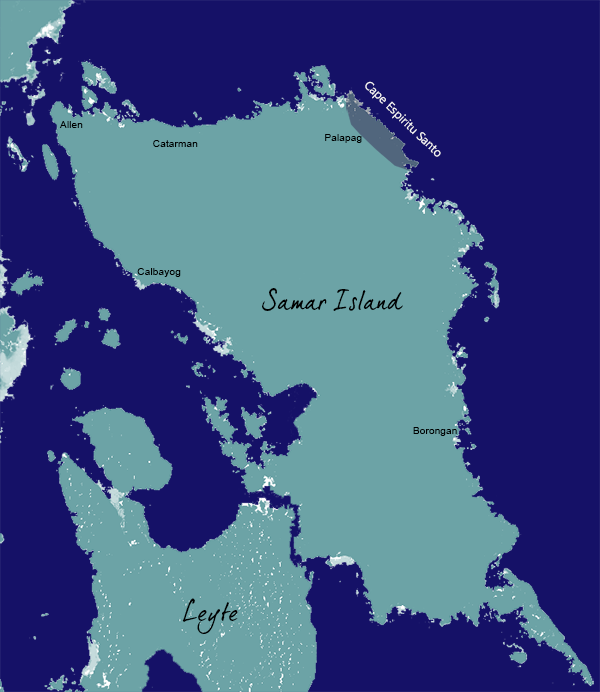
- Coordinates: 12°32′06″N 125°11′20″E
- Location: Philippines
- Water bodies: Pacific Ocean

Cape Espiritu Santo, also known as Cape Espiritu Santo Mountains, is the northeastern point of the Northern Samar and the northernmost point of Samar Island. It was named Cabo Espiritu Santo by early European explorers, since it was discovered on the Feast of the Holy Spirit. It is also the first land sighted by the Spaniards when sailing from Nueva España, marks the end of their long sailing as they approaches the land and coast of the Ibabaw in the Philippines. Spanish navigators noted the mountains' value as they are visible 40 miles out to sea. There are two prominent summits in this location. One rises 1,481 ft (451.41 m) and the other 1,457 ft (444.09 m).

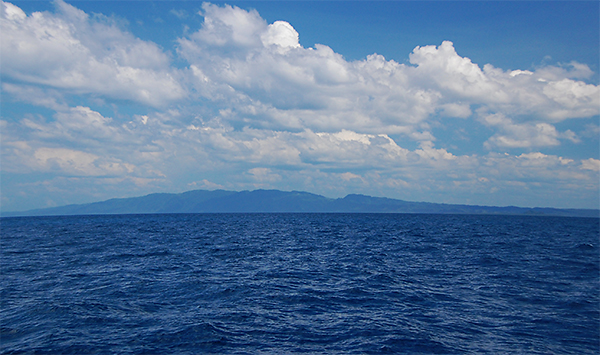
View of Cape Espiritu Santo from the Pacific Ocean

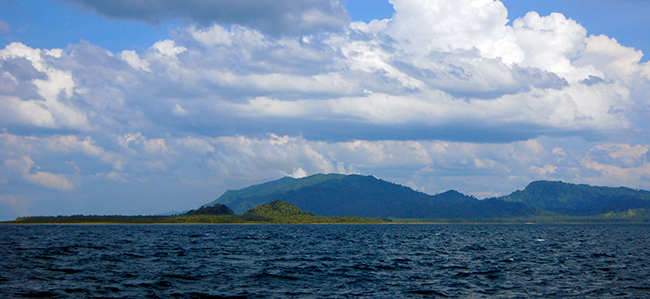
Photo of Cape Espiritu Santo taken 3 km (1.86 mi) West of Batag Island

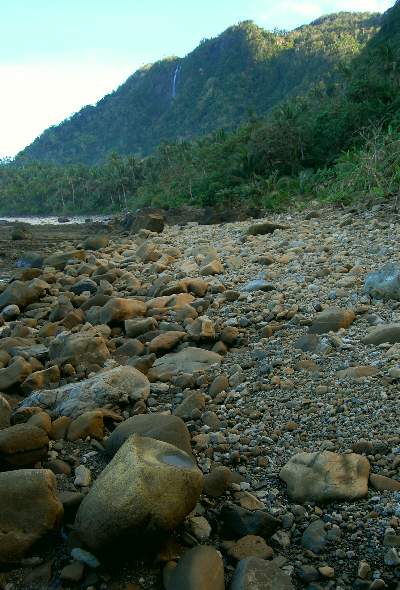
Cape Espiritu Santo falls
