= ARA Parker (M-11) =

History

Argentina
- Name: Parker
- Namesake: Enrique Guillermo Parker
- Builder: Sanchez Shipyard, San Fernando
- Launched: 2 May 1937
- Commissioned: 1937
- Decommissioned: 1967
- Identification: Pennant number M-11
- Fate: Discarded 23 July 1963

General characteristics
- Class & type: Bouchard-class minesweeper
- Displacement: 450 long tons (457 t) (standard); 520 long tons (528 t) (full load)
- Length: 59.00 m (193 ft 7 in) oa
- Beam: 7.30 m (23 ft 11 in)
- Draught: 2.27 m (7 ft 5 in)
- Propulsion: 2 shafts; 2 × MAN 2-cycle diesel engines, 2,000 bhp (1,500 kW)
- Speed: 15 knots (28 km/h; 17 mph)
- Range: 3,000 nautical miles (5,600 km; 3,500 mi) at 10 knots (19 km/h; 12 mph)
- Endurance: 50 long tons (51 t) fuel oil
- Complement: 62
- Armament: 2 × single 99 mm (3.9 in) guns; 1 × twin 40 mm (1.6 in) AA guns; 2 × 7.65 mm (0.301 in) machine guns

ARA Parker (M-11) was a Bouchard-class minesweeper of the Argentine Navy.

== History ==
ARA Parker was launched on May 2, 1937 in the Lujan River. She was initially classed as an auxiliary ship assigned to Defence Command, participating in exercises under the Sea Fleet in South Atlantic waters under its first Commander, Lieutenant Aníbal Olivieri. In 1940, it was assigned to the Instruction Squadron of the Military Naval School, along with ARA Sarmiento, Puevrredon and Py. She forward based to Río Santiago, Puerto Belgrano Naval Base, Golfo Nuevo, Mar del Plata and Punta del Este, before returning to Río Santiago. In April 1940, she joined the 1st Division of Trackers and participated in the training of the Sea Fleet, in the South Atlantic.

== Bibliography ==
- Scheina, Robert L. & Smigielski, Adam (1995). "Argentina". In Chumbley, Stephen (ed.). Conway's All the World's Fighting Ships, 1947–1995 (revised ed.). Naval Institute Press. pp. 3–12. ISBN 1-55750-132-7.
