= Intrépida-class fast attack craft =

1974 class of fast attack craft

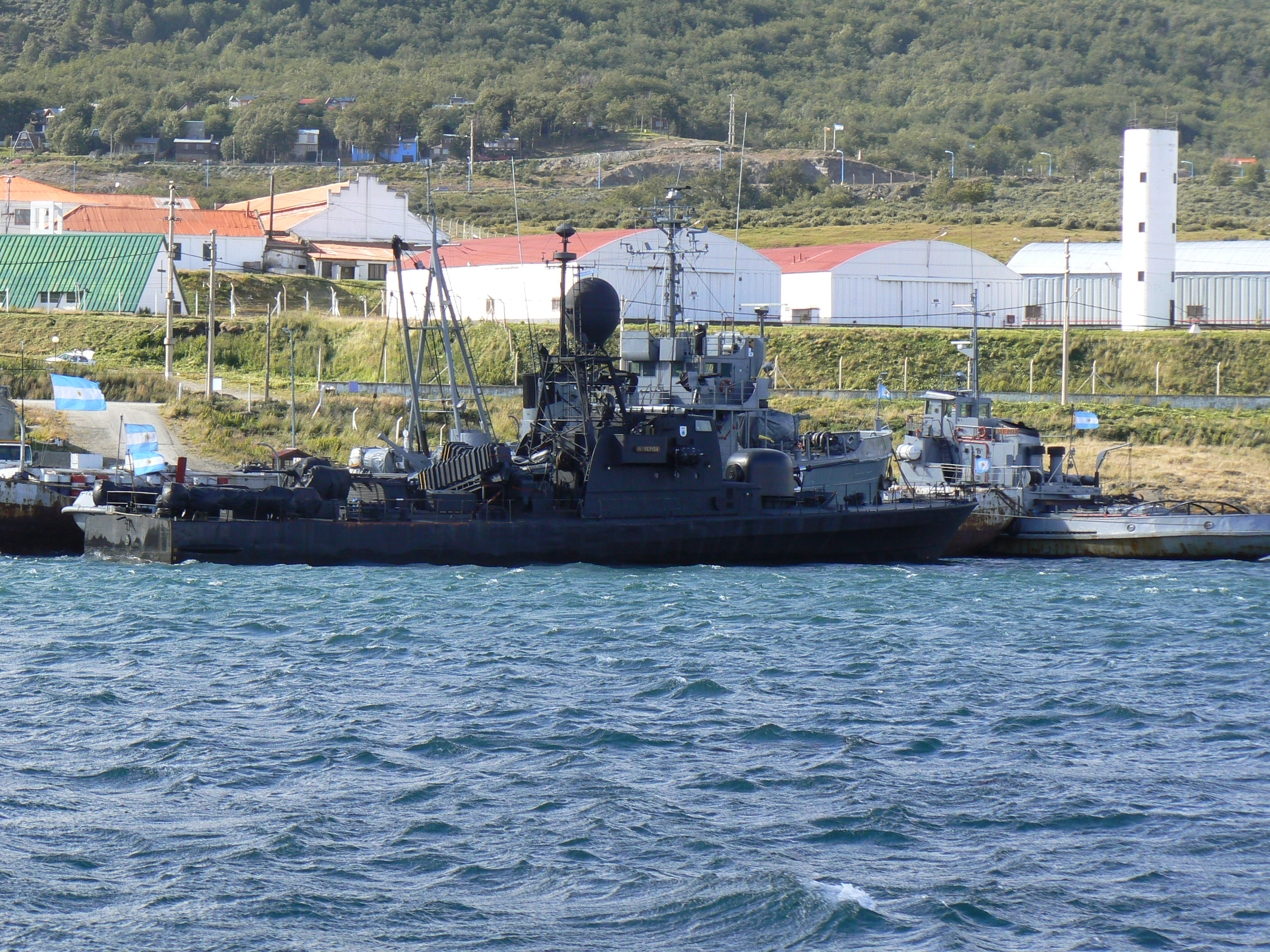
- ARA Intrépida (P-85) at its homeport, Ushuaia

Class overview
- Builders: Lürssen
- Operators: Argentina
- Built: 1970s
- In commission: 1974-present
- Completed: 2
- Active: 2

General characteristics
- Type: Fast attack craft
- Displacement: 268 tons (full load)
- Length: 174 ft 3 in (53.11 m)
- Draft: 7 ft 9 in (2.36 m)
- Speed: 25 knots (46 km/h)
- Range: 1,450 nautical miles (3,000 km) at 20 knots (37 km/h)
- Complement: 5 officers, 31 enlisted
- Electronic warfare & decoys: Racal RDL 1
- Armament: 2 Aerospatiale Exocet MM 38; 1 OTO Melara 3 in (76 mm)/62 compact; 1 or 2 Bofors 40 mm/70; 2 Oerlikon 81 mm rocket launchers; 2 21 in (533 mm) torpedo launchers, AEG SST-4 torpedoes

The Intrépida class is a class of fast attack craft that was built by Lürssen for the Argentine Navy in the early 1970s. The ships are based on Lürssen's TNC 45 design.

== Operational history ==
As of 2021 Intrépida was reported active and participated in a sea exercise with the destroyer Sarandi, the corvettes Espora, Spiro, Robinson and Gómez Roca and with aircraft from Argentine naval aviation.

Both vessels were reported active on exercises in 2022.

== Ships in the class ==
- ARA Intrépida (P-85)
- ARA Indómita (P-86)

== See also ==
- Albatros-class fast attack craft (Type 143)
- Gepard-class fast attack craft (Type 143A)
- Tiger-class fast attack craft (Type 148)
- Sa'ar 4-class missile boat (Reshef)
