= ARA Los Andes =

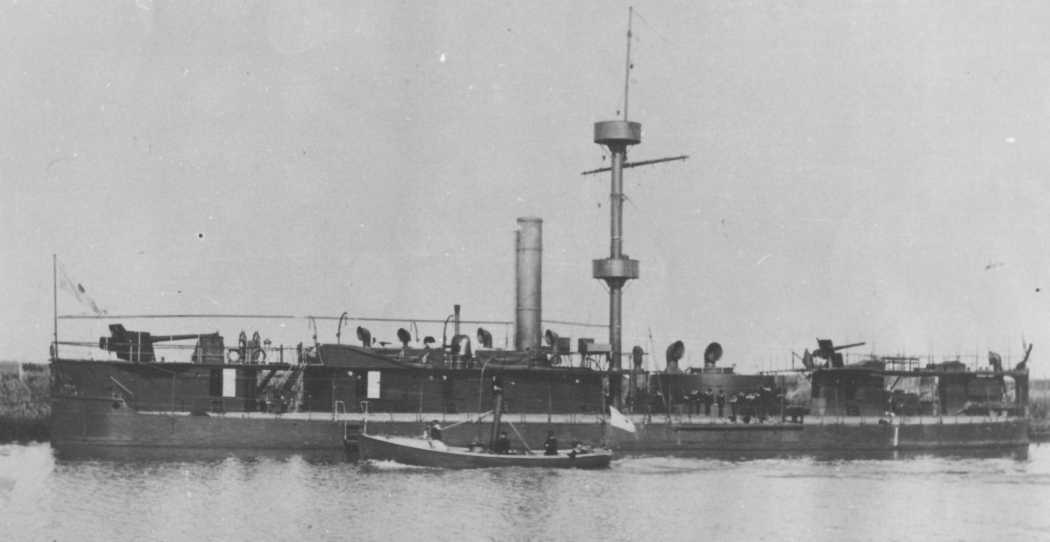
- Los Andes at anchor, about 1905

History

Argentina
- Name: ARA Los Andes
- Namesake: Andes
- Builder: Laird Brothers, Birkenhead
- Launched: 29 October 1874
- Stricken: 16 November 1927
- Fate: Scrapped, 1929?

General characteristics (as built)
- Type: El Plata-class monitor
- Displacement: 1,535–1,677 long tons (1,560–1,704 t)
- Length: 180 ft (54.9 m) (p/p)
- Beam: 44 ft (13.4 m)
- Draft: 9 ft 1 in (2.8 m)
- Installed power: 750 ihp (560 kW)
- Propulsion: 2 shafts, 2 compound steam engines
- Speed: 9 knots (17 km/h; 10 mph)
- Range: 1,400 nmi (2,600 km; 1,600 mi)
- Complement: 120
- Armament: 2 × 9 in (229 mm) muzzle-loading rifles
- Armor: Belt: 4.5–6 in (114–152 mm); Deck: 1 in (25 mm); Gun turret: 8–10 in (203–254 mm)

ARA Los Andes was one of two El Plata-class monitors built in Britain in the 1870s for the Argentine Navy.

== Description ==
The El Plata-class monitors were 186 feet (56.7 m) long overall, with a beam of 44 feet (13.4 m) and a draft of 9.5–10.5 feet (2.9–3.2 m). They displaced 1,535–1,677 long tons (1,560–1,704 t), and their crew numbered 120 officers and enlisted men.

The ships had two compound steam engines, each driving one propeller shaft, rated at a total power of 750 indicated horsepower (560 kW). This gave them a maximum speed of 9–9.5 knots (16.7–17.6 km/h; 10.4–10.9 mph). They carried 120 long tons (122 t) of coal which gave them a range of approximately 1,400 nautical miles (2,600 km; 1,600 mi).
