= ARA Intrépida =

Intrépida-class fast attack craft of the Argentine Navy

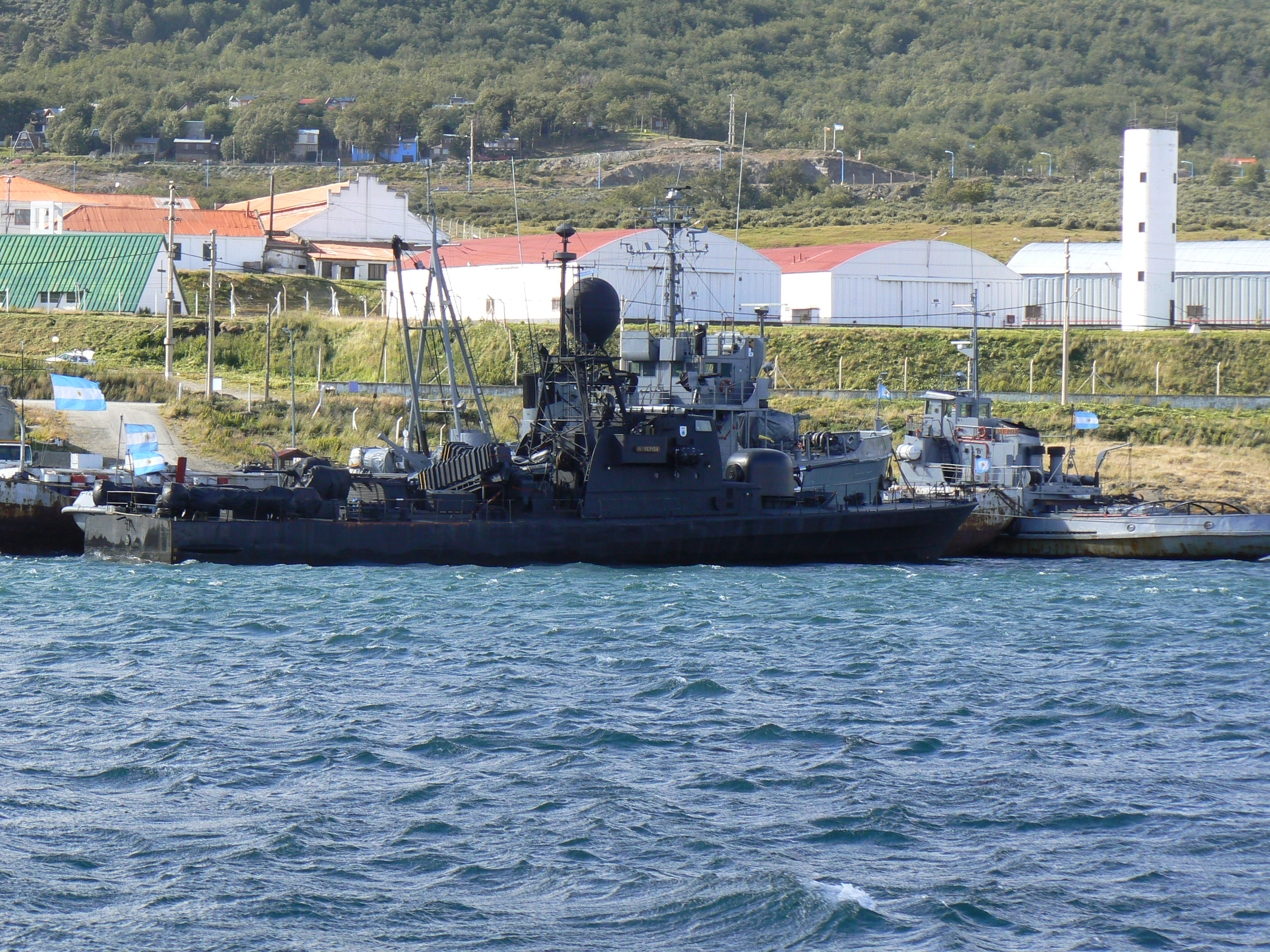
- ARA Intrépida at its home port in Ushuaia

History

Argentina
- Operator: Argentine Navy
- Ordered: 1970
- Builder: Lürssen
- Laid down: 1970
- Launched: 2 December 1973
- Commissioned: July 1974
- Home port: Ushuaia
- Status: in active service
- Badge

General characteristics
- Class & type: Intrépida-class fast attack craft
- Displacement: 260 tons full load
- Length: 45.4 m (149 ft)
- Beam: 7.4 m (24 ft)
- Draught: 2.3 m (7.5 ft)
- Installed power: 12,000 shp (8.9 MW)
- Propulsion: 4 MTU MD 16 V 538 TB90 diesel engines, 4× propellers
- Speed: 38 knots (70 km/h)
- Range: 1,450 nautical miles (2,690 km) at 20 knots (37 km/h)
- Complement: 39
- Armament: 1 OTO Melara 76 mm rapid-firing cannon; 2 Bofors 40 mm L/70; 2 Oerlikon 20 mm multiple rocket launchers; 2 553 mm AEG-SST4 anti-surface torpedo launchers; 2 Exocet MM.38 launchers

ARA Intrépida (P-85) is the lead ship of the Intrépida-class fast attack craft of the Argentine Navy. The ship is the lead ship of its class and has a twin sister ship ARA Indómita (P-86). She is the second ship of the Argentina Navy to bear the name Intrépida.

== Construction ==
The ship was ordered in 1970 and built by the Lürssen in Bremen-Vegesack, Germany.

== Service history ==
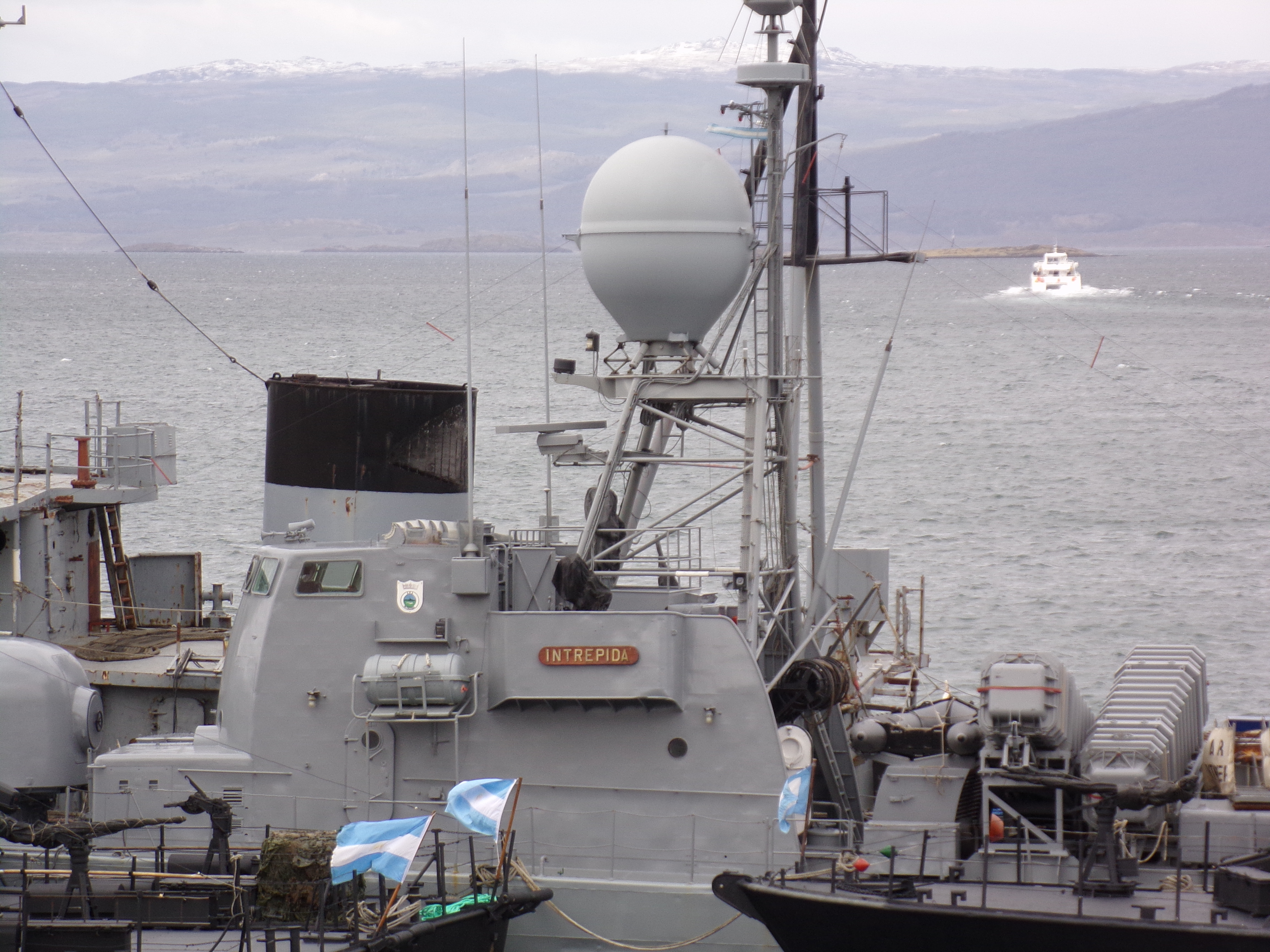
Closeup of ARA Intrépida

As of 2021, Intrépida was reported active and participated in a sea exercise with the destroyer Sarandi, the corvettes Espora, Spiro, Robinson and Gómez Roca, and with aircraft from the Argentine naval aviation unit. She was again active on exercises in mid-2022.

== Bibliography ==
- Scheina, Robert L. & Smigelski, Adam (1995). "Argentina". In Chumbley, Stephen (ed.). Conway's All the World's Fighting Ships, 1947–1995 (revised ed.). Naval Institute Press. ISBN 1-55750-132-7.
