= USS Reading =

Tacoma-class patrol frigate

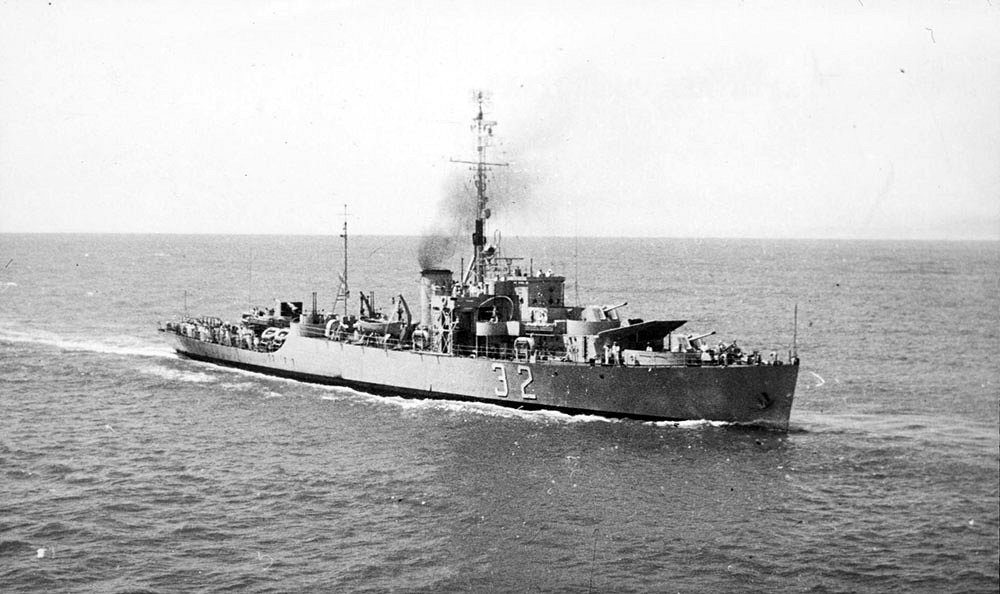
- ARA Heroína (P32) ex-USS Reading (PF-66)

History

United States
- Name: Reading
- Namesake: City of Reading, Pennsylvania
- Builder: Leathem D. Smith Shipbuilding Company, Sturgeon Bay, Wisconsin
- Laid down: 23 May 1943
- Launched: 28 August 1943
- Commissioned: 19 August 1944
- Decommissioned: 19 December 1945
- Stricken: 5 January 1946
- Fate: Resold to Argentina, July 1947

Argentina
- Name: Heroína
- Acquired: July 1947
- Fate: Scrapped, 1966

General characteristics
- Class & type: Tacoma-class frigate
- Displacement: 1,264 long tons (1,284 t)
- Length: 303 ft 11 in (92.63 m)
- Beam: 37 ft 6 in (11.43 m)
- Draft: 13 ft 8 in (4.17 m)
- Propulsion: 2 × 5,500 shp (4,101 kW) turbines; 3 boilers; 2 shafts
- Speed: 20 knots (37 km/h; 23 mph)
- Complement: 190
- Armament: 3 × 3"/50 dual purpose guns (3x1); 4 x 40 mm guns (2×2); 9 × 20 mm guns (9×1); 1 × Hedgehog anti-submarine mortar; 8 × Y-gun depth charge projectors; 2 × Depth charge tracks

USS Reading (PF-66), a Tacoma-class frigate, originally classified as PG-174, was the only ship of the United States Navy to be named for Reading, Pennsylvania.

In 1947, she was sold to Argentina, entering service with the Argentine Navy as ARA Heroina (P-32); she was scrapped in 1966.

== Construction ==
Reading (PF-66) was laid down by the Leathem D. Smith Shipbuilding Company, in Sturgeon Bay, Wisconsin, on 23 May 1943; launched on 28 August 1943, sponsored by Mrs. John C. Butterweck; towed down the Mississippi and commissioned at New Orleans, Louisiana, on 19 August 1944. The broken christening bottle and other artifacts from and relating to the ship are in the collection of the Historical Society of Berks County, located in Reading, PA.

== Service history ==
=== World War II ===
Following shakedown off Bermuda, Reading reported for fast convoy escort duty between the United States and European and North African ports. Her first such duty began in January 1945 when she departed Norfolk, Virginia, for Algeria. Returning to the United States with another convoy, she made one more round-trip to the Mediterranean before the end of the war with Germany.

On 26 May Reading commenced conversion to a weather ship. An intricate array of meteorological equipment was installed, her number three 3-inch (76 mm) gun mount was replaced by a hangar for a weather blimp, and a supply of cold weather gear was taken on board before the Reading was declared ready for sea on 10 June. Her first weather station was off Boston, where she was forced to "lie to" because it was too deep to anchor. In the fall, the weather ship moved northward and took station between the Canadian and Icelandic coasts. Weather observations were transmitted 12 times daily and homing signals were radioed to aircraft periodically. When relieved from her station, the ship put into either NS Argentia, Newfoundland or Reykjavík, Iceland for refueling and provisioning.

=== Postwar ===
On 16 November Reading received orders for decommissioning. She put in at Portsmouth, Virginia, and was decommissioned there on 19 December 1945.

=== Argentine service ===
She was struck from the Navy list on 5 January 1946, delivered to United Boat Service Corporation, New York City, and then resold to Argentina in July 1947 and renamed ARA Heroína (P-32). In Argentine service the armament was re-worked, shipping 3 Swedish Bofors 10.5cm dual purpose guns with 2 twin and 4 single hand-worked 40mm Bofors guns also purchased from Sweden. The ship was scrapped in 1966.
