= ARA Indómita =

Intrépida-class fast attack craft of the Argentine Navy

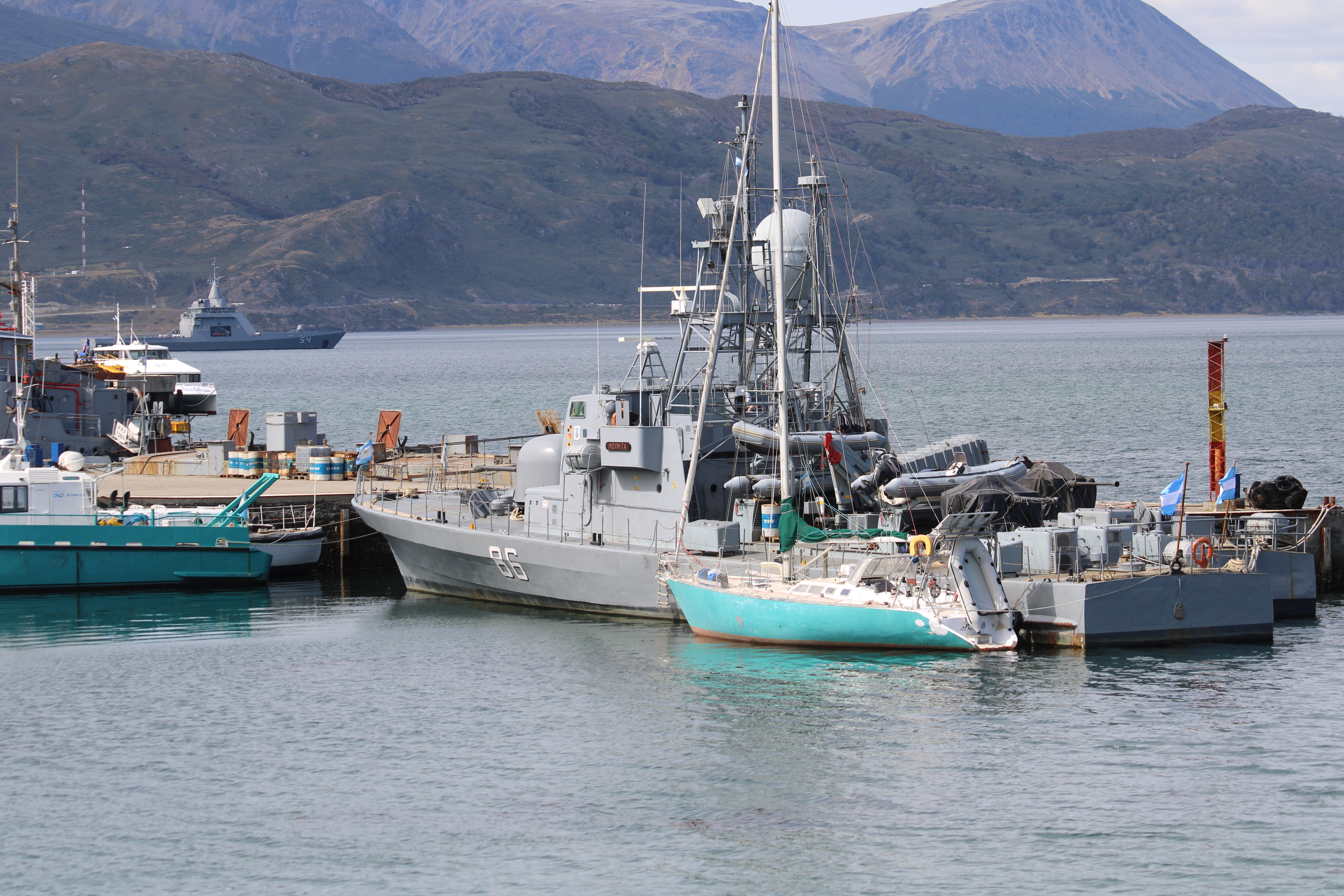

History

Argentina
- Operator: Argentine Navy
- Ordered: 1970
- Builder: Lürssen
- Laid down: 1970
- Launched: 8 April 1974
- Commissioned: December 1974
- Home port: Ushuaia
- Status: in active service

General characteristics
- Class & type: Intrépida-class fast attack craft
- Displacement: 260 tons full load
- Length: 44.9 m (147 ft 4 in)
- Beam: 7.4 m (24 ft 3 in)
- Draught: 2.4 m (7 ft 10 in)
- Installed power: 12,000 shp (8.9 MW)
- Propulsion: 4 MTU MD 16 V 538 TB90 diesel engines, 4× propellers
- Speed: 38 knots (70 km/h; 44 mph)
- Range: 1,450 nmi (2,690 km; 1,670 mi) at 20 knots (37 km/h; 23 mph)
- Complement: 39
- Armament: 1 OTO Melara 76 mm rapid-firing cannon; 2 Bofors 40 mm L/70; 2 Oerlikon 20 mm multiple rocket launchers; 2 553 mm AEG-SST4 anti-surface torpedo launchers; 2 Exocet MM.38 launchers

ARA Indómita (P-86) is an Intrépida-class fast attack craft of the Argentine Navy. The vessel has a twin sister ship, ARA Intrépida. It is the first Argentine ship to bear the name.

The vessel was reported active as of 2022. In October 2022 it was reported that Indómita had received an upgrade incorporating a Stabilized Naval Observation and Marksmanship System (SEON) to enhance her surveillance capabilities.

In 2023, Indómita, accompanied by the patrol boats Baradero and Barranqueras, conducted joint exercises with the patrol vessels Piloto Sibbald and Aspirante Isaza of the Chilean Navy.

== Bibliography ==
- Scheina, Robert L. & Smigelski, Adam (1995). "Argentina". In Chumbley, Stephen (ed.). Conway's All the World's Fighting Ships, 1947–1995 (revised ed.). Naval Institute Press. ISBN 1-55750-132-7.
