= Sea Fleet Command (Argentina) =

- Comando de la Flota de Mar
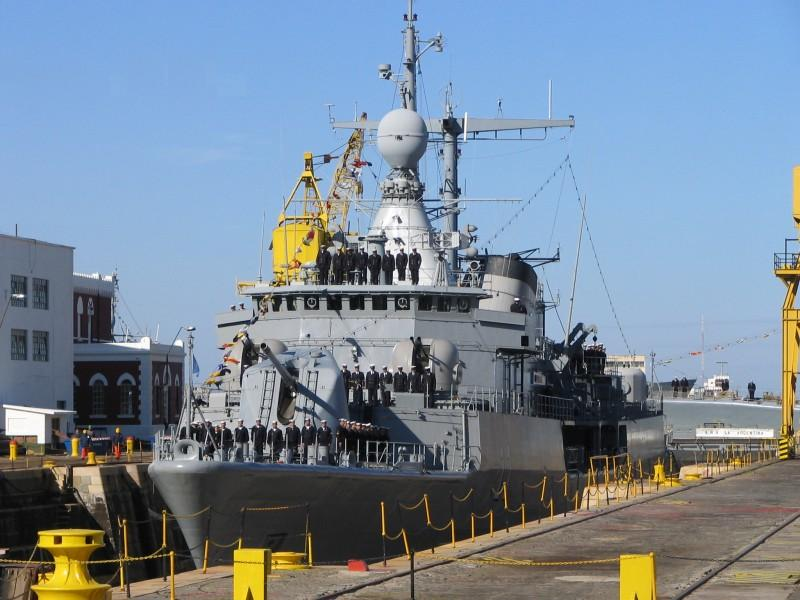
- ARA La Argentina (D-11) Almirante Brown-class destroyer in Puerto Belgrano Naval Base.
- Country: Argentina
- Branch: Argentine Navy
- Role: Naval warfare
- Size: 17 ships
- Part of: Navy Training and Enlistment Command
- Garrison/HQ: Puerto Belgrano Naval Base
- Nicknames: COFM, FLOMAR
- Engagements: Falklands War; Operativo Alfil

Commanders
- Commander of the Sea Fleet: Ship-of-the-line captain Julio Horacio Guardia

Insignia
- Identification symbol

The Sea Fleet Command (Spanish: Comando de la Flota de Mar; COFM) is one of the commands in the Argentine Navy, headquartered at Puerto Belgrano Naval Base (BNPB).

== Mission ==
The Sea Fleet is in charge of the integrated naval training, counts on marines unit (Spanish: Fuerza de la Infantería de Marina de la Flota de Mar) and a naval aviation unit (Spanish: Grupo Aéreo Embarcado) attached.

== Current composition ==
=== Destroyer Division ===
- Mission: Surface warfare, submarine warfare, anti-missile and electronic warfare
- Ships:
  - ARA Almirante Brown - Almirante Brown-class destroyer
  - ARA La Argentina - Almirante Brown-class destroyer
  - ARA Sarandí - Almirante Brown-class destroyer

=== Frigate & Corvette Division ===
- Mission: Sea control, surface warfare, submarine warfare, anti-missile and electronic warfare
- Ships:
  - ARA Espora - Espora-class corvette
  - ARA Rosales - Espora-class corvette
  - ARA Spiro - Espora-class corvette
  - ARA Parker - Espora-class corvette
  - ARA Robinson - Espora-class corvette
  - ARA Gómez Roca - Espora-class corvette

=== Naval Amphibious and Logistic Command ===
- Mission: Planning and execution of amphibious warfare, anti-aircraft warfare and logistical support of the fleet
- Ships:
  - ARA Patagonia Durance-class tanker
  - ARA Canal Beagle Costa Sur-class cargo ship
  - ARA Bahía San Blas Costa Sur-class amphibious cargo ship
  - ARA Punta Alta multipurpose auxiliary ship
  - ARA Teniente Olivieri Marsea-class aviso
  - ARA Estrecho de San Carlos Neftegaz-class aviso
  - ARA Bahía Agradable Neftegaz-class aviso
  - ARA Islas Malvinas Neftegaz-class aviso

=== Embarked Air Group ===
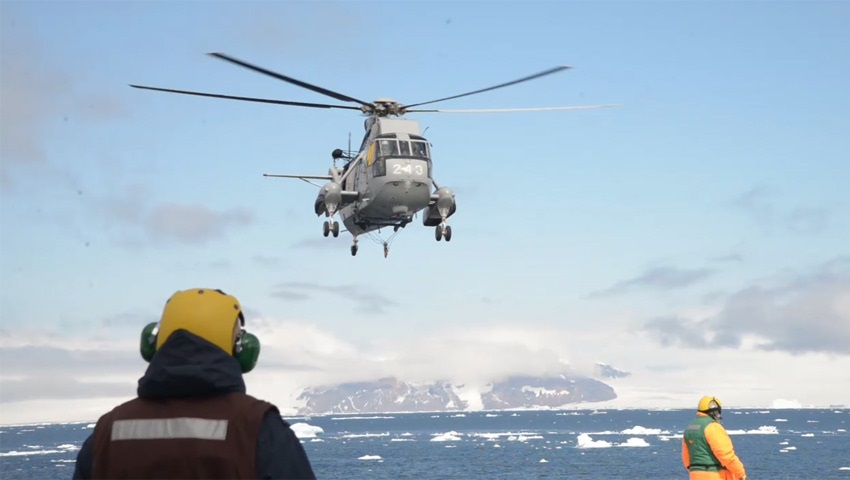
Sea King approaching the Esperanza base.

- 2nd Naval Air Helicopters Squadron Sikorsky S-61D-4 Sea King helicopter on Almirante Irízar icebreaker.
- 3rd Naval Air Helicopters Squadron Eurocopter AS555 SN Fennec 2 helicopter on MEKO-360 and MEKO-140 ships.

== See also ==
- Argentine Marines
- Argentine Naval Aviation
- Argentine Submarines Force
