= Operativo Alfil =

Argentine contribution to the Gulf War coalition against Iraq

Operation Bishop (Spanish: Operativo Alfil)
- Part of Operation Desert Shield
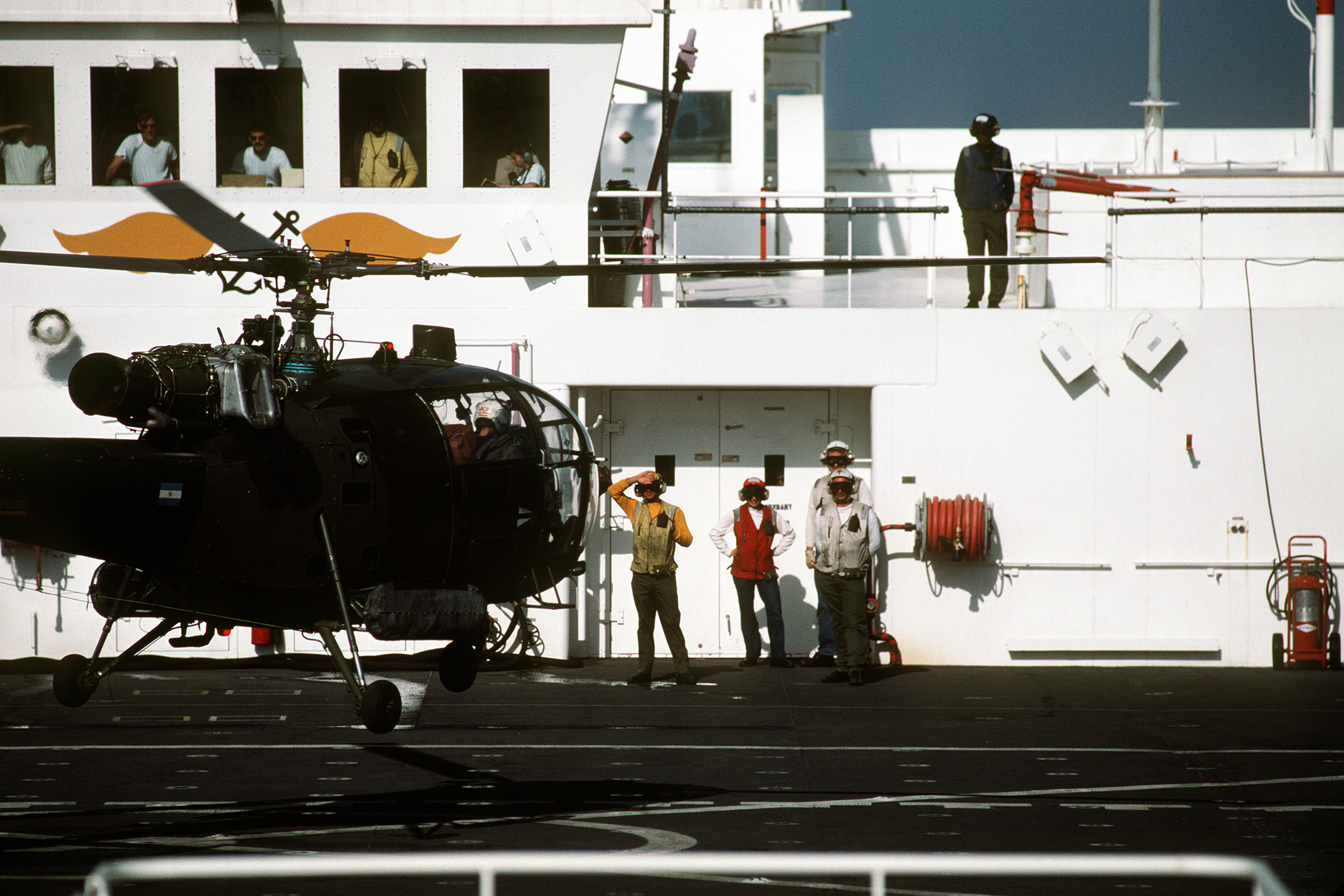
- Argentine Navy Alouette III helicopter onboard USNS Comfort in 1991.
- Operational scope: Operational
- Location: Persian Gulf
- Commanded by: Ship-of-the-line Captain Eduardo Rosenthal September 1990-February 1991; Ship-of-the-line Captain Rodolfo Hasselbag February 1991-May 1991
- Objective: Control maritime traffic and enforce the seizure of materials, merchandise and cargo that went to or came from Iraq or Kuwait
- Date: September 1990-August 1991
- Executed by: 88.0 Task Group: September 1990-February 1991; 88.1 Task Group: February 1991-May 1991
- Outcome: Coalition victory Designation of Argentina as Major non-NATO ally
- Casualties: One Alouette III helicopter damaged

Statistics
- Part of: Operation Bishop
- Commanders: Ship-of-the-line Captain Eduardo Rosenthal; Ship-of-the-line Captain Rodolfo Hasselbag
- Operations: 570 interceptions and 17 escort missions
- Victories: 29 vessels successfully escorted

Operation Bishop (Spanish: Operativo Alfil) was the Argentine contribution to the coalition forces from around 42 nations led by the United States in the Gulf War against Iraq in response to Iraq's invasion and annexation of Kuwait. Overall the contributions composed of four military vessels and two helicopters.

Operation Alfil led to Argentina being designated a major non-NATO ally of the United States by President Bill Clinton in 1998.

The contributions were organized into two task groups—Task Group 88.0 and Task Group 88.1—each with two vessels with first Task Group 88.0 sent in September 1990 to then be relieved by Task Group 88.1 by February 1991. The task groups comprised the following:

Task Group 88.0

- MEKO 360H2 type Almirante Brown-class destroyer ARA Almirante Brown (D-10)
- MEKO 140A16 type Espora-class corvette ARA Spiro (P-43)
- 2 x Aérospatiale SA 316B Alouette III helicopters

Task Group 88.1

- MEKO 140A16 type Espora-class corvette ARA Rosales (P-42)
- Costa Sur-class amphibious cargo ship ARA Bahía San Blas (B-4)

== See also ==
- Sea Fleet Command (Argentina)
