= List of ship launches in 1984 =

The list of ship launches in 1984 includes a chronological list of all ships launched in 1984.

Date	Ship	Class / type	Builder	Location	Country	Notes
5 January	Belgica	Research vessel	Boelwerf	Temse	Belgium	For Management Unit of North Sea Mathematical Models
9 January	Kandalaksha	SA-15 type cargo ship	Wärtsilä Perno Shipyard	Turku	Finland	
28 January	British Steel	Bulk carrier	Harland & Wolff	Belfast	United Kingdom	For British Steel Corporation.
1 February	Hamashio	Yūshio-class submarine			Japan	For Japanese Navy
8 February	Charles Darwin	Research vessel	Appledore Shipbuilders	Appledore	United Kingdom	For Natural Environment Research Council.
18 February	Hawes	Oliver Hazard Perry-class frigate	Bath Iron Works	Bath, Maine	United States	For United States Navy.
18 February	Royal Princess	Cruise ship	Wärtsilä Helsinki Shipyard	Helsinki	Finland	For Princess Cruises
21 February	Altmark	Ohre-class barracks ship	VEB Peene-Werft	Wolgast	East Germany	For Volksmarine.
24 February	Mercandian Duke	Type FV 1500 RoRo-ship	Frederikshavn Værft	Frederikshavn	Denmark	For K/S Merc-Scandia XXXVII
17 March	Primauguet	Georges Leygues-class frigate			France	For French Navy
17 March	Tireless	Trafalgar-class submarine			United Kingdom	For Royal Navy.
18 March	TSS Fairsky				France	For Sitmar Cruises
23 March	Anadyry	SA-15 type cargo ship	Valmet Vuosaari shipyard	Helsinki	Finland	
30 March	Parker	Espora-class corvette	Astilleros y Fábricas Navales del Estado	Ensenada, Buenos Aires Province	Argentina	For Argentine Navy.
30 March	Nikel	SA-15 type cargo ship	Wärtsilä Perno shipyard	Turku	Finland	
14 April	Vincennes	Ticonderoga-class cruiser	Ingalls Shipbuilding	Pascagoula, Mississippi	United States	For United States Navy.
30 April	Harz Wische	Ohre-class barracks ship	VEB Peene-Werft	Wolgast	East Germany	For Volksmarine.
12 May	Elrod	Oliver Hazard Perry-class frigate	Bath Iron Works	Bath, Maine	United States	For United States Navy.
16 May	Nasr al Bahr	Landing Craft	Brooke Marine	Lowestoft	United Kingdom	For Royal Omani Navy.
19 May	Alabama	Ohio-class submarine	Electric Boat	Groton, Connecticut	United States	For United States Navy.
22 June	Mercandian Gigant	Type FV 2100 RoRo-ship	Frederikshavn Værft	Frederikshavn	Denmark	For Per Henriksen
23 June	Ford	Oliver Hazard Perry-class frigate	Todd Pacific Shipyards	San Pedro, California	United States	For United States Navy.
23 June	Valley Forge	Ticonderoga-class cruiser	Ingalls Shipbuilding	Pascagoula, Mississippi	United States	For United States Navy.
29 June	Germantown	Whidbey Island-class dock landing ship	Lockheed Shipbuilding	Seattle, Washington	United States	For United States Navy.
30 June	SKR-149	Koni-class frigate	Werft 340	Zelenodolsk	Soviet Union	For Soviet Navy.
10 July	Yamayuki	Hatsuyuki-class destroyer			Japan	For Japanese Navy.
4 August	Providence	Los Angeles-class submarine	Electric Boat	Groton, Connecticut	United States	For United States Navy.
24 August	Havelland	Ohre-class barracks ship	VEB Peene-Werft	Wolgast	East Germany	For Volksmarine.
31 August	Simpson	Oliver Hazard Perry-class frigate	Bath Iron Works	Bath, Maine	United States	For United States Navy.
31 August	Margareta	General cargo ship	Detlef Hegemann Rolandwerft	Bremen	West Germany	For Thekla Schepers KG, Haren
22&September	Bottsand	Bottsand-class oil recovery ship	C. Lühring	Brake	West Germany	For German Navy
23 September	English Star	Refrigerated cargo ship	Harland & Wolff	Belfast	United Kingdom	For Blue Star Line.
23 September	Scottish Star	Refrigerated cargo ship	Harland & Wolff	Belfast	United Kingdom	For Blue Star Line.
date	Jokulfell	Refrigerated cargo ship	Appledore Shipbuilders	Appledore	United Kingdom	For Eimskipafelag Islands H/f.
27 September	Mega Smeralda	Cruiseferry	Wärtsilä Helsinki Shipyard	Helsinki	Finland	For Johnson Line (Silja Line traffic)
28 September	Mariella	Cruiseferry	Wärtsilä Perno shipyard	Turku	Finland	For SF Line
28 September	Mercandian Globe	Type FV 2100 RoRo-ship	Frederikshavn Værft	Frederikshavn	Denmark	For Per Henriksen
8 October	Mariátegui	Carvajal-class frigate	SIMA	Callao	Peru	For Peruvian Navy
13 October	Chicago	Los Angeles-class submarine	Newport News Shipbuilding	Newport News, Virginia	United States	For United States Navy.
25 October	Matsuyuki	Hatsuyuki-class destroyer			Japan	For Japanese Navy
27 October	London	Type 22 frigate	Yarrow Shipbuilders	Glasgow	United Kingdom	For Royal Navy.
27 October	Theodore Roosevelt	Nimitz-class aircraft carrier	Newport News Shipbuilding	Newport News, Virginia	United States	For United States Navy.
28 October	Stena Polonica	Ferry	Stocznia im Lenina	Gdańsk	Poland	For Stena Line
9 November	Hatakaze	Hatakaze-class destroyer	Mitsubishi Heavy Industries		Japan	For Japanese Navy
11 November	Santa María	Santa María-class frigate	Bazan	Ferrol	Spain	For Spanish Navy
14 November	Gómez Roca	Espora-class corvette	Astilleros y Fábricas Navales del Estado	Ensenada, Buenos Aires Province	Argentina	For Argentine Navy.
21 November	Peder Paars	Ferry	Nakskov Skibsværft	Nakskov	Denmark	For DSB Färjedivision
25 November	Robinson	Espora-class corvette	Astilleros y Fábricas Navales del Estado	Ensenada, Buenos Aires Province	Argentina	For Argentine Navy.
8 December	Pittsburgh	Los Angeles-class submarine	Electric Boat	Groton, Connecticut	United States	For United States Navy.
8 December	Samuel B. Roberts	Oliver Hazard Perry-class frigate	Bath Iron Works	Bath, Maine	United States	For United States Navy.
13 December	Shishumar	Type 209 submarine	Howaldtswerke-Deutsche Werft	Kiel	West Germany	For Indian Navy
Unknown date	Benalan	Tug	David Abels Boatbuilders	Bristol	United Kingdom	For private owner.
Unknown date	Island Rose	Passenger launch	David Abels Boatbuilders	Bristol	United Kingdom	For private owner.
Unknown date	Melody K	Riverboat	Arkwright	Corby	United Kingdom	For private owner.
Unknown date	Puffin	Workboat	David Abels Boatbuilders	Bristol	United Kingdom	For Commissioners of Irish Lights.
Unknown date	Uskmoor	Buoy tender	David Abels Boatbuilders	Bristol	United Kingdom	For Newport Harbour Commissioners.
