= ARA Alférez Sobral =

1972 Argentine Navy auxiliary ship

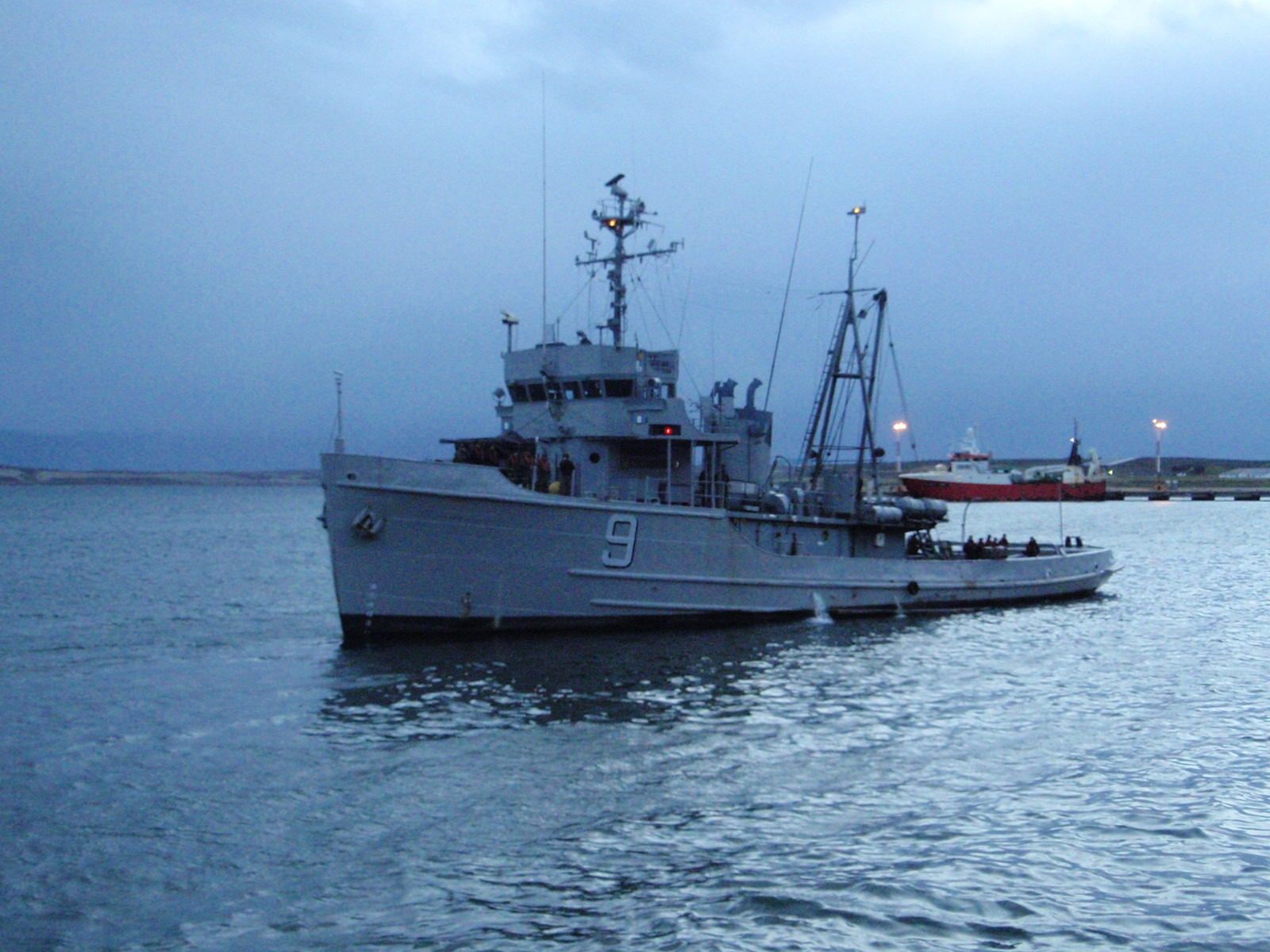
- Alférez Sobral in Ushuaia, 2008

History

United States
- Namesake: Salish tribe
- Laid down: 29 August 1944
- Launched: 29 September 1944
- Commissioned: 7 December 1944
- Decommissioned: 10 February 1972
- Renamed: Salish, 16 July 1948
- Fate: transferred to Argentine Navy, 10 February 1972

Argentina
- Name: Alférez Sobral
- Namesake: José María Sobral
- Acquired: 10 February 1972
- Decommissioned: August 2018
- Fate: Sunk 21 May 2025

General characteristics
- Displacement: 835 tons (848 t) (full)
- Length: 143 ft (44 m)
- Beam: 33 ft 10 in (10.31 m)
- Draft: 13 ft 2 in (4.01 m)
- Propulsion: Diesel-electric engines, 1,500 shp (1,100 kW) single screw
- Speed: 13 knots (24 km/h; 15 mph)
- Complement: 45–49
- Armament: as Salish; 1 × single 3 inch/50 guns, 2 × twin 40 mm AA guns; as Alférez Sobral; 1 × 40 mm /60 Bofors gun, 2 × Oerlikon 20 mm cannon

ARA Alférez Sobral (A-9) was an 800-ton ocean-going tug that was in service with the Argentine Navy from 1972 until 2019, where she was classified as an aviso. Launched in 1944, she had previously served in the US Navy as the fleet tug USS Salish (ATA-187). In Argentine service an aviso is a small naval vessel used for a number of auxiliary tasks, including tugging, laying buoys, and replenishing other ships, lighthouses and naval bases.

== US Navy service ==
Built by Levingston Shipbuilding Co., at Orange, Texas as a Sotoyomo-class rescue tug, she served as USS Salish (ATA-187) from 1944 to 1972.

== Argentine Navy service ==
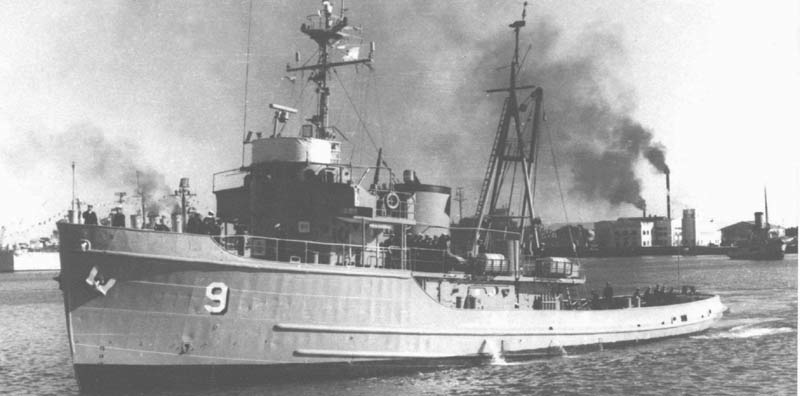
Alférez Sobral shortly after joining Argentina's Navy

The ship was named after Antarctic explorer Alférez José María Sobral (1880–1961). She was acquired on 10 February 1972 along with her sister-ship ARA Comodoro Somellera from Mayport, Florida on 6 March 1972 and arriving to Puerto Belgrano on 18 April.

=== Falklands War ===
In the early hours of 3 May 1982, the vessel was hit by at least two Sea Skua anti-ship missiles fired by British Westland Lynx HAS.Mk.2/3 helicopters.

At the time the ship was approximately 60 nautical miles (110 km; 69 mi) north of the Falkland Islands searching for the crew of a Canberra bomber that had been shot down two days earlier by an AIM-9 Sidewinder AAM (air-to-air missile) fired from a British BAe Sea Harrier FRS.Mk.1 (XZ451). The Alférez Sobral was initially spotted by a Westland Sea King helicopter. When the helicopter approached to investigate and was engaged by Alférez Sobral's fore Oerlikon 20 mm cannon, the helicopter retreated and requested an armed response.

In response HMS Coventry and HMS Glasgow launched their Westland Lynx HAS.Mk.2/3 helicopters. Coventry's Lynx (XZ242) attacked first, firing two Sea Skua (air-to-surface) anti-ship missiles. One of the missiles narrowly missed the bridge, the second hit Alférez Sobral's fibreglass motorboat, injuring the crew of an Oerlikon cannon and knocking out the radio aerials.

Twenty minutes later Glasgow's Lynx (XZ247) launched two more missiles, at least one of which struck the bridge, causing extensive damage. The attack killed eight of the crew, including the ship's captain, Lieutenant Commander Sergio Gómez Roca, and injured eight. The Alférez Sobral lost all her electrical power, radio, radar and compass; she had no working navigational aids other than a landing compass, unsuitable for sailing.

She was found and helped by a Sikorsky S-61N LV-OCL (a civilian helicopter requisitioned by the Argentine Air Force as part of Escuadron Fenix and piloted by First Lieutenant Lucero) which evacuated the injured. Alférez Sobral was then piloted by the civilian trawler María Alejandra and finally reached Puerto Deseado on 5 May. The attack had occurred at the approximated position 49°50′00″S 58°37′00″W.

=== Post-war ===
Alférez Sobral was based at Ushuaia from 1993 to 2010, when she moved to Mar del Plata switching places with ARA Gurruchaga. In 2001 she assisted the expedition ship Caledonian Star which had been struck by a rogue wave during transit of the Drake Passage. She remained in service until 2018. After several years at dock, Alférez Sobral was expended as target off Mar del Plata on 21 May 2025, shelled by the aviso ARA Puerto Argentino.

== Legacy ==
The ship survived the conflict and remained in naval service until August 2018. There were plans to preserve Alférez Sobral as a museum ship in Santa Fe, however, these never came to fruition. In 2022 it was reported that she might be placed on the disposal list. The ship's badly damaged bridge is currently on display at the National Naval Museum in Tigre, Buenos Aires Province, Argentina.

Argentina's second batch Espora class corvette was renamed ARA Gómez Roca (P-46) to honour Sobral's captain, Sergio Raul Goméz Roca, the first commander of an Argentine ship to be killed in action since the war with Brazil in the 19th century. The aviso ARA Teniente Olivieri (A-2) is named after the guardamarina (midshipman) Claudio Olivieri, also killed in the action and posthumously promoted to lieutenant.

== Specifications ==
ARA (A-9) Alférez Sobral, Sotoyomo-class aviso
Displacement 835 tonnes
Length 43.6 m
Beam 10.3 m
Draught 2.2 m
Propulsion 2 GM 12-278 A diesel-electric 2200 HP engines, 2 1500 HP generators, 1 propeller
Cruising speed 8 kn
Maximum speed 13 kn
Range 16,500 nm
Armament 1 Bofors 40/60 C cannon, 2 x 20mm Oerlikon cannons
Crew: 46
