= ARA Robinson =

At least two ships of the Argentine Navy have been named Robinson:

- ARA Robinson (M-3), a Bouchard-class minesweeper commissioned in 1939 and decommissioned in 1967.
- ARA Robinson (P-45), an Espora-class corvette launched in 1984.
