= Greek Argentines =

Ελληνοαργεντινοί (Greek) Greco-argentinos (Spanish)
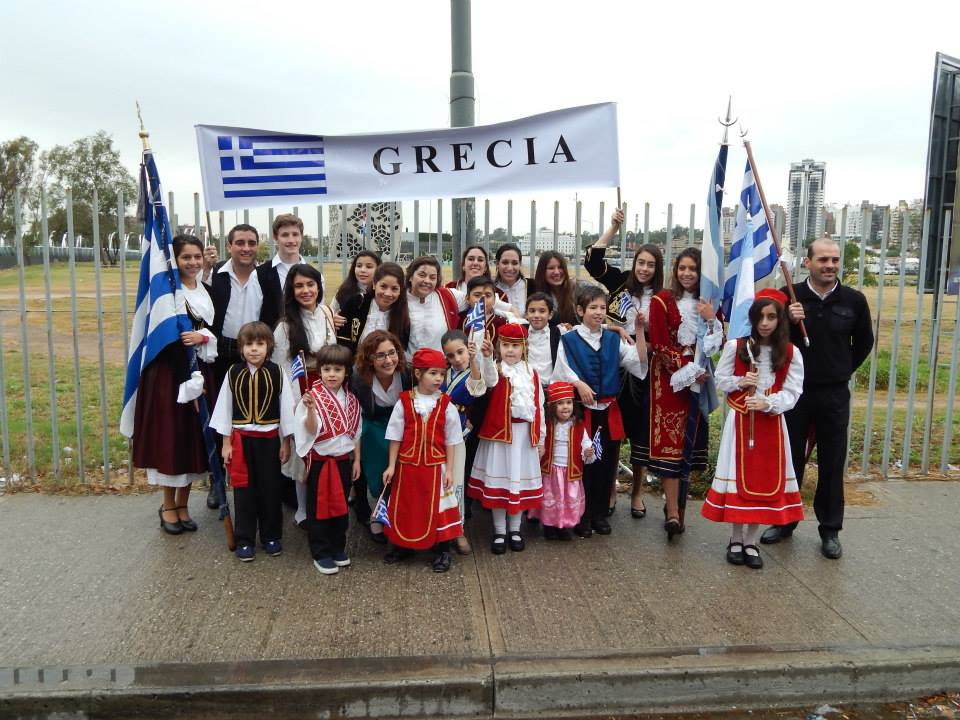
- Greek Argentines in Córdoba

Total population
- 100,000

Languages
- Spanish • Greek

Religion
- Eastern Orthodoxy

Related ethnic groups
- Greeks; Greek Uruguayans; Greek Americans; Greek Canadians; Greek Australians; Greek Brazilians

Greek Argentines (Greek: Ελληνοαργεντινοί; Spanish: Greco-argentinos) are Argentine citizens of Greek descent or Greek-born people who reside in Argentina. Despite not being as large as other Europe communities, the Greeks have contributed a lot to their new country. The first immigrants arrived at the end of the 18th century, while the bulk of immigration occurred during the first half of the 20th century.

== History ==
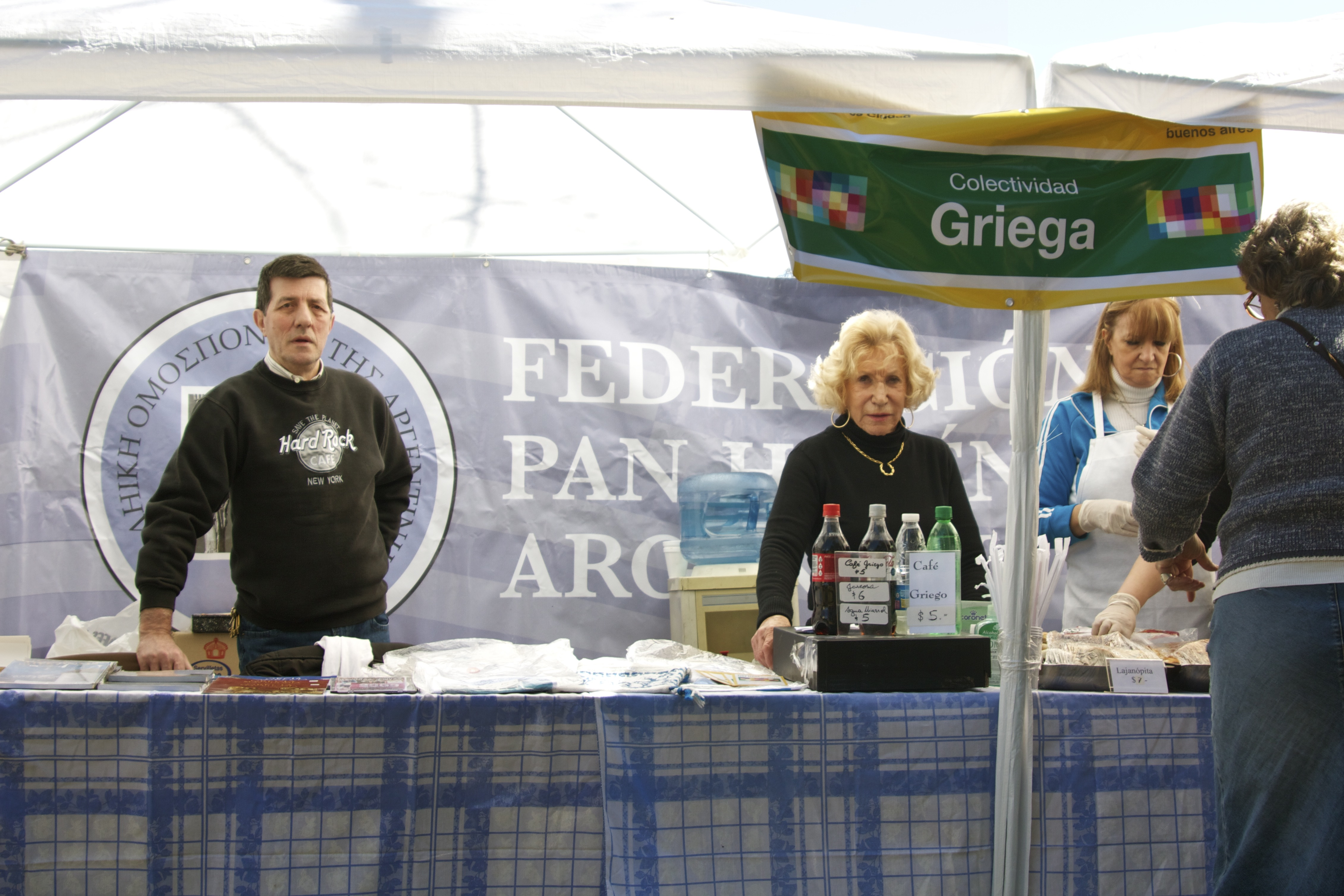
Greek Argentines on Immigrant Day in Buenos Aires 2010.

Rear Admiral Giorgos "Jorge" Kolmaniatis, a native from Hydra who arrived in the United Provinces of the Río de la Plata in 1811, strongly contributed to the Argentine War of Independence by leading and training the newly formed fleet. Samuel Spiro, a fellow naval officer, either from Spetses or Mytilene, scuttled his ship in the Uruguay River rather than surrender it to the Spanish Armada. Both men's names were honored with Argentine Navy ships christened after them in 1937.

The second wave of Greeks arriving in Argentina came in the 20th century, mainly after the Asia Minor Campaign and the disaster in 1922. Again huge masses of refugees who were sent to Greece by the population exchange agreement between Kemal Atatürk and Eleftherios Venizelos, came towards these latitudes seeking a chance to restart their lives from zero. Most of them were from Smyrna, Ayvalık and other Ionian cities. They settled in what is today known as the capital of foreign immigration in Argentina, the city of Berisso, near La Plata. There are between 80,000-100,000 people of Greek origin in Argentina.

The third wave, taking place in the early 1930s, was the first one with a strong concentration of immigrants coming from the mainland, mostly villagers and peasants from Arcadia, Laconia and Messenia in the Peloponnese. The choice of Argentina as a destination was due to the temporary denial of immigration to the United States, making Argentina in particular the new Eldorado.

The majority chose Buenos Aires as their place to stay, but others made their way far in the interior such as Córdoba, Mendoza, Mar del Plata, Comodoro Rivadavia and even Tartagal. Port cities like Rosario, La Plata, Concordia, Zárate, Campana, Berisso and Necochea are also places where Hellenic immigrants established.

== Notable Greek Argentines ==
- Anacarsis Lanús - businessman
- Bartolomé Mitre - President of Argentina from 1862 to 1868. The original family name was Mitropoulos and later changed to Mitre
- Emanuel Moriatis - race car driver
- Aristotle Onassis - lived in Argentina during the 1920s and 1930s, becoming the leading local cigarette importer
- Christina Onassis - Aristotle's daughter
- Oscar Panno - chess grandmaster
- Graciela Paraskevaidis - writer and composer
- Samuel Spiro - naval officer and patriot
- Constantino Tsallis - physics researcher
- Adriana Xenides - actress
- Emiliano Ellacopulos - football player
- Mónica Antonópulos - actress
- Eduardos Kontogeorgakis - professional footballer
- Gabriel Katopodis - politician
- Alexandra Kehayoglou - artist
- Andrés Zottos - politician

== See also ==
- Argentina–Greece relations
- Argentines of European descent
- Greek diaspora
- Romanian Argentines
- Armenian Argentines
- Ashes of Paradise, a 1997 Argentine film
