= Espora =

Espora may refer to:

- Colonel (Navy) Tomás Espora, an Argentine Navy officer during the Cisplatine War
- Comandante Espora Airport, named after the Argentine naval officer, located in Bahía Blanca, Argentina
  - Comandante Espora Naval Air Base, an Argentine Navy air base co-located with the airport
- Espora-class corvette, a class of warships in service with the Argentine Navy
- Several ships in the Argentine Navy, named after the Argentine naval officer:
  - Espora (1865), a brigantine that served from 1865 to 1867
  - Espora (1890), a torpedo boat that served from 1891 to 1916
  - Colonel Espora, a steamship that served between 1867 and 1878
  - ARA Espora (D 21), a Fletcher-class destroyer (formerly USS Dortch (DD-670)), transferred to Argentina in 1961 and decommissioned in 1975
  - ARA Espora (P-41), a corvette in service since 1985, lead ship of her class
