= Baptista de Andrade-class corvette =

Portuguese class of corvettes

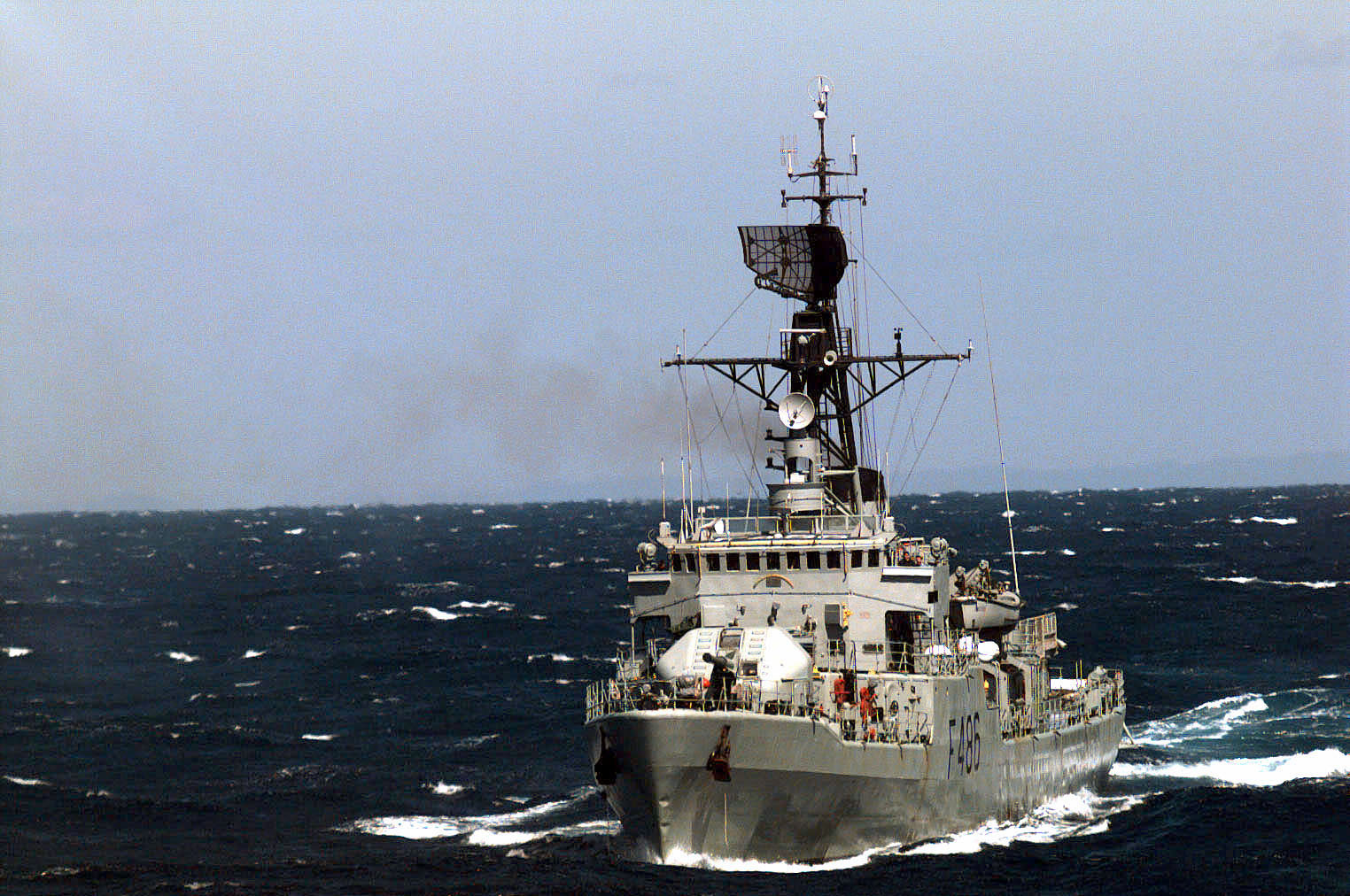
- NRP Baptista de Andrade (F 486), 1998

Class overview
- Name: Baptista de Andrade
- Builders: Bazan, Ferrol, Spain
- Operators: Portuguese Navy
- Preceded by: João Coutinho class
- Succeeded by: Viana do Castelo-class patrol vessel
- Built: 1972–1976
- In commission: 1974–2026
- Completed: 4
- Active: 0
- Retired: 4

General characteristics
- Type: Corvette
- Displacement: 1,203 tons standard, 1,380 tons full load
- Length: 84.6 m (277 ft 7 in)
- Beam: 10.3 m (33 ft 10 in)
- Draught: 3.1 m (10 ft 2 in)
- Propulsion: 2 shaft, 2 OEW Pielstick diesel engines, 10,560 hp (7,870 kW)
- Speed: 23 knots (43 km/h; 26 mph)
- Range: 5,900 nmi (10,900 km; 6,800 mi) at 18 kn (33 km/h; 21 mph)
- Complement: 113
- Sensors & processing systems: Former: Radar: AWS-2 air search(Removed later), TM-626 navigation, Pollux fire control; Sonar: Diodon; Current: Radar: Kelvin Hughes KH5000, Racal Decca RM316P
- Armament: 1 × 100 mm (4 in) gun; 2 × single 40 mm/L70 Bofors guns; 2 × triple 12.75-inch (324 mm) ASW torpedo tubes
- Aviation facilities: 1 helicopter pad for 1 x Super Lynx Mk.95
- Notes: Source: Conway's All the World's Fighting Ships 1947-95

The Baptista de Andrade class was a class of four Portuguese-designed corvettes, built for the Portuguese Navy by BAZAN in Francoist Spain in the 1970s. They are an updated version of the João Coutinho class - designed by the Portuguese naval engineer Rogério de Oliveira - with more modern armament and sensors.

Like the João Coutinho ships, the Baptista de Andrade corvettes were intended to operate in the Portuguese overseas territories. Allegedly, the ships would originally be intended to the South African Navy, the delivery being canceled after the Portuguese Carnation Revolution in 1974. After Portugal withdrew from its colonies, the four ships were due to be sold to the Colombian Navy in 1977 but the deal was not completed.

One ship, NRP Oliveira e Carmo, was decommissioned in 1999 and was officially scrapped on 1 November 2007 and later sunk as an artificial reef on 30 October 2012. NRP Afonso Cerqueira was decommissioned on 13 February 2015 and later sunk as an artificial reef off Madeira. Another ship was decommissioned in 2017 and the last one in 2026. This class was replaced by Viana do Castelo-class patrol vessels.

== Ships ==
Pennant number	Name	Launched	Commissioned	Status
F486	Baptista de Andrade	March 1973	November 1974	Decommissioned 2017. Sank at moorings between 19 and 23 April 2023. Awaiting scrapping.
F487	João Roby	June 1973	March 1975	Decommissioned 2026.
F488	Afonso Cerqueira	October 1973	June 1975	Decommissioned 2015, sunk as artificial reef in September 2018 in sea of Madeira
F489	Oliveira e Carmo	February 1974	February 1976	Decommissioned 1999, scrapped 2007, sunk as artificial reef 2012 in Lagos, Portugal
