= João Coutinho-class corvette =

1970 class of Portuguese Navy corvettes

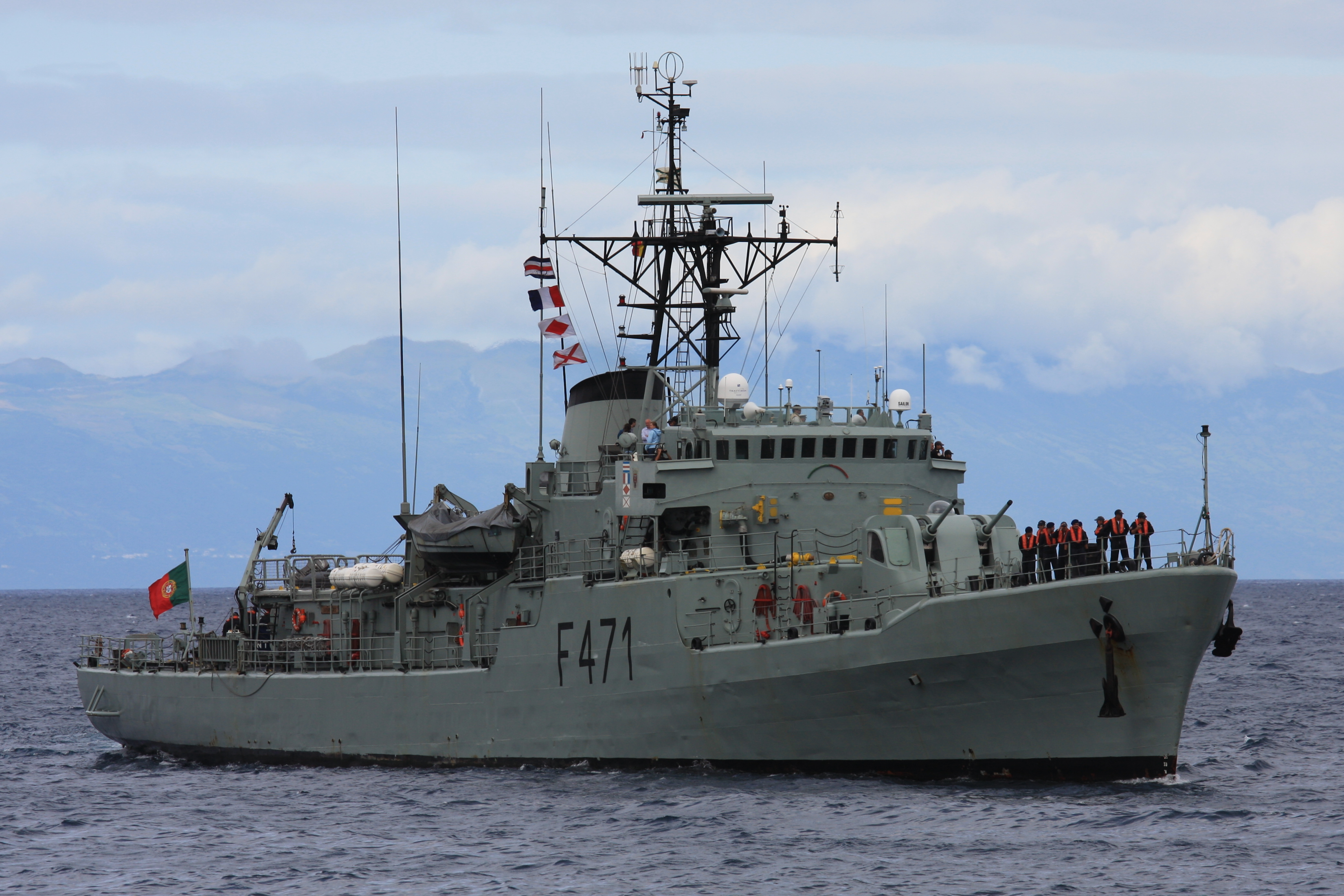
- NRP António Enes, a João Coutinho-class corvette entering the port of Horta

Class overview
- Name: João Coutinho class
- Builders: Bazán, Cartagena (Spain); Blohm & Voss, Hamburg (West Germany)
- Operators: Portuguese Navy
- Preceded by: João Belo class
- Succeeded by: Baptista de Andrade class
- Built: 1968–1971
- In commission: 1970–2025
- Completed: 6
- Active: 0
- Retired: 6

General characteristics
- Type: Frigate/corvette
- Displacement: 1,252 t (1,232 long tons) standard; 1,401 t (1,379 long tons) full load
- Length: 84.6 m (277 ft 7 in) oa; 81.0 m (265 ft 9 in) pp
- Beam: 10.3 m (33 ft 10 in)
- Draught: 3.3 m (10 ft 10 in)
- Propulsion: 2 shaft, 2 OEW Pielstick diesel engines, 7,870 kW (10,560 bhp)
- Speed: 24.4 knots (45.2 km/h; 28.1 mph)
- Range: 5,000 nmi (9,300 km; 5,800 mi) at 18 knots (33 km/h; 21 mph)
- Troops: 34 Marines
- Complement: 93
- Sensors & processing systems: Western Electric AN/SPG-34 fire-control radar; Kelvin Hugues surface search radar; MLA-1B air search radar; QCU-2 sonar
- Armament: 1 × twin 3 in (76 mm)/50 calibre Mk 33 guns; 1 × twin 40 mm (1.6 in)/L70 Bofors guns; Hedgehog ASW mortar; 2 × depth charge throwers; 2 × depth charge racks (removed in 1987)

The João Coutinho-class corvettes were a series of warships built for the Portuguese Navy for service in Portugal's African and Indian colonies. Initially rated as frigates, they were downgraded first to corvettes and then patrol vessels with age. They were designed in Portugal by naval engineer Rogério de Oliveira, but the urgent need of their services in the Portuguese Colonial War meant that the construction of the ships was assigned to foreign shipyards. Six ships were built; the first three ships were built by Blohm & Voss and the remaining three by Empresa Nacional Bazán. The ships were launched in 1970 and 1971. The relative cheap cost of the design led to it being the basis of several other classes in other navies. From 1970 until the end of the conflict in 1975, the corvettes were used for patrol and fire-support missions in Angola, Mozambique, Guinea and Cape Verde. After the African colonies gained their independence, the corvettes were assigned to patrol duties in Portuguese territorial waters.

== Design and description ==
In the 1960s Portugal still retained an empire and used a series of smaller vessels, such as frigates and gunboats to patrol its territorial waters. However in 1961, India invaded and annexed Portuguese colonies on the Indian subcontinent and further unrest in the Portuguese African colonies led to a boom in naval shipbuilding in response. The João Coutinho class were designed in Portugal by naval engineer Rogério de Oliveira and were initially rated as frigates measuring 84.6 metres (277 ft 7 in) long overall and 81.0 m (265 ft 9 in) between perpendiculars with a beam of 10.3 m (33 ft 10 in) and a draught of 3.3 m (10 ft 10 in). The ships had a standard displacement of 1,252 tonnes (1,232 long tons) and 1,401 t (1,379 long tons) at full load. The ships were powered by two OEW-Pielstick 12 PC2 2 V400 diesel engines turning two shafts creating 7,870 kilowatts (10,560 bhp). This provided the vessels with a maximum speed of 24.4 knots (45.2 km/h; 28.1 mph). They had a range of 5,000 nautical miles (9,300 km; 5,800 mi) at 18 knots (33 km/h; 21 mph) and 5,900 nmi (10,900 km; 6,800 mi) at 8 knots (15 km/h; 9.2 mph).

The João Coutinho class was initially armed with a twin 3-inch (76 mm)/50 calibre Mk 33 dual-purpose gun mount and a twin 40-millimetre (1.6 in)/L70 Bofors gun mount for anti-aircraft defence. (Note: L70 describes the gun's calibre and denotes the length of the gun. This means that the length of the gun barrel is 70 times the bore diameter.) The ships also mounted a Mk 10 Hedgehog anti-submarine (ASW) mortar, two Mk 6 depth charge projectors and two Mk 9 depth charge racks. The vessels carried 1,200 rounds of ammunition, 240 Hedgehog projectiles and up to 84 depth charges.

The corvettes were equipped with MLA-1B air search radar, a Mk 51 Mod 2 fire-control director for the 40 mm guns, a Mk 63 Mod 21 fire-control system and SPG-34 gunfire control radar for the 3-inch guns. For ASW, the vessels mounted a QCU-2 sonar. By 1987 all ASW equipment was removed and the MLA-1B radar was replaced with a Kelvin Hughes 1002 surface search radar from 1989 to 1991. In 1994, the SPG-34 radar and Mk 63 fire control system were removed, forcing the main guns to be controlled manually. The vessel's had an initial complement of 93 including 9 officers and had accommodations for 34 Marines. As equipment was removed, the number of personnel on the ships was reduced by 23. By 2009, the class was rated as corvettes and by 2013, patrol vessels.

Since this design was relatively cheap, the João Coutinho class served as the basis for several other designs: the Baptista de Andrade-class corvettes (Portugal), the Descubierta-class corvettes (Spain, Egypt and Morocco), the Espora-class (MEKO 140) corvettes (Argentina) and the D'Estienne d'Orves-class (A-69) avisos (France, Argentina and Turkey).

== Construction and service career ==
Though the vessels were designed in Portugal, the urgent need of their services in the Portuguese Colonial War meant that the construction of the ships was assigned to foreign shipyards. They were acquired to replace the older corvettes, sloops and gunboats in service with the Portuguese Navy. Three ships were constructed by Bazán at their shipyard in Cartagena, Spain and three by Blohm & Voss at their yard in Hamburg, West Germany. The ships were initially used to defend Portuguese interests in their empire until its collapse in 1975. After that, the vessels were predominantly used for fisheries protection. A mid-1980s refit was cancelled due to lack of funds. The last ship, NRP António Enes, was ordered in September 2025 to be decommissioned due to lack of spares, crew and the high maintenance costs to remain operational and seaworthy.

== Ships ==
Construction data (Note: Data is from Wertheim and Saunders and Couhat except where noted)
Pennant number	Name	Builder	Laid down	Launched	Commissioned	Status
F471	NRP António Enes	Bazán	10 April 1968	16 August 1969	18 June 1971	In September 2025 the decision to decommission and scrap the ship was made
F475	NRP João Coutinho	Blohm & Voss	24 December 1968 (Note: Lyon & Chumbley and Couhat state the keel was laid down in September 1968.)	2 May 1969	7 March 1970 (Note: Saunders states the ship was commissioned on 28 February 1970.)	Decommissioned 2014. Sank at moorings, February 2022. Awaiting scrapping.
F476	NRP Jacinto Cândido	Blohm & Voss	10 February 1969 (Note: Lyon & Chumbley and Couhat state the keel was laid down in April 1968.)	16 June 1969	10 June 1970 (Note: Saunders states the ship was commissioned on 29 May 1970.)	Decommissioned 2018, waiting to be scrapped
F477	NRP General Pereira D'Eça	Blohm & Voss	21 April 1969 (Note: Lyon & Chumbley and Couhat state the keel was laid down in October 1968.)	26 July 1969	10 October 1970	Decommissioned 2014, sunk as artificial reef 2016
F484	NRP Augusto de Castilho	Bazán	August 1968	5 July 1969	14 November 1970	Decommissioned 2004, scrapped 2011
F485	NRP Honório Barreto	Bazán	July 1968	11 April 1970	15 April 1971	Decommissioned 2003, scrapped 2011

== Disposal ==
Honório Barreto was decommissioned in 2003 and Augusto de Castilho in 2004. The two ships were purchased by a metal company, RAPLUS, for scrapping in 2011. General Pereira D'Eça was decommissioned in 2014 and sunk off Madeira as an artificial reef in 2016. João Coutinho was decommissioned in 2014. In 2018, Jacinto Cândido was decommissioned.
