= USS Salish =

Tugboat of the United States Navy

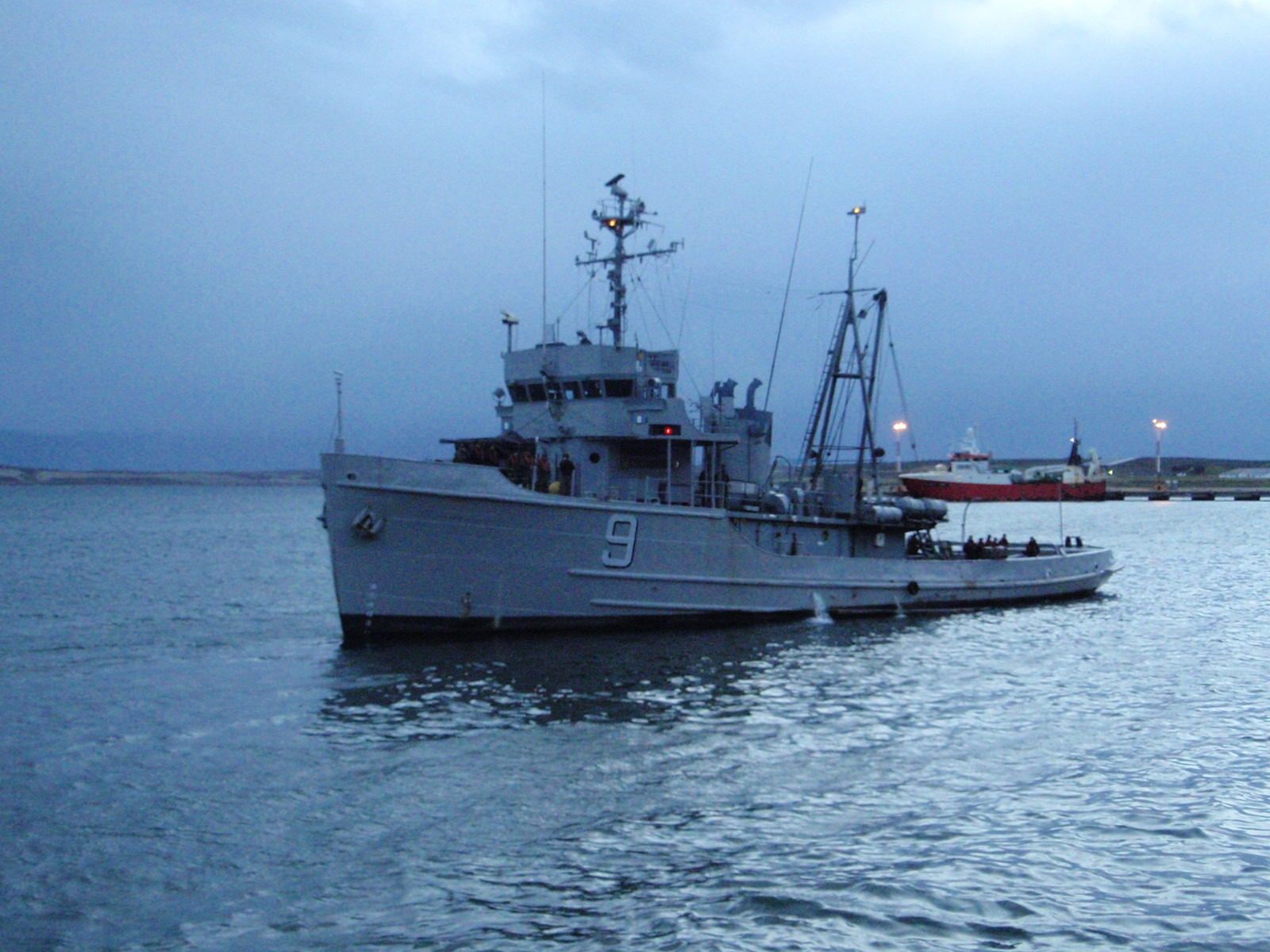
- ARA Alférez Sobral (A-9), former USS Salish (ATA-187)

History

United States
- Name: ATA-187
- Laid down: 29 August 1944
- Launched: 29 September 1944
- Commissioned: 7 December 1944
- Renamed: Salish, 16 July 1948
- Decommissioned: 10 February 1972
- Fate: transferred to Argentine Navy, 10 February 1972
- Stricken: 1 February 1975

Argentina
- Name: ARA Alférez Sobral
- Acquired: 10 February 1972
- Decommissioned: August 2018
- Identification: A-9
- Fate: Sunk 21 May 2025

General characteristics
- Displacement: 835 tons (848 t) (full)
- Length: 143 ft (44 m)
- Beam: 33 ft 10 in (10.31 m)
- Draft: 13 ft 2 in (4.01 m)
- Propulsion: Diesel-electric engines, 1,500 shp (1,100 kW) single screw
- Speed: 13 knots (24 km/h; 15 mph)
- Complement: 45–49
- Armament: as Salish; 1 × single 3 in (76 mm)/50 guns, 2 × twin 40 mm AA guns; as Alférez Sobral; 1 × 40 mm/60 Bofors gun, 2 × Oerlikon 20 mm cannon

USS Salish (ATA-187) (previously ATR-114) was a Sotoyomo-class rescue tug of the US Navy. Her hull was laid down on 29 August 1944. She left US service on 10 February 1972 and was recommissioned in the Argentine Navy on the same day as the ARA Alférez Sobral (A-9).

== US Navy service ==
ATA-187 (ex-ATR-114) was laid down on 29 August 1944 by the Levingston Shipbuilding Co., Orange, Texas; launched on 29 September 1944; and commissioned on 7 December 1944.

=== World War II ===
Designated for duty with Service Division 101 in the Pacific, ATA-187 completed shakedown early in January 1945, and departed New Orleans for Hawaii on the 18th with APL-10 in tow. She reached Pearl Harbor on 4 March; exchanged the barracks ship for two lighters; and continued across the Pacific. At Guam, she changed tows again and sailed for the Ryukyus pulling two floating derricks. On 22 April, she delivered her charges to the Hagushi anchorage, Okinawa; then, retraced her route back to Guam, whence she made a second run, with a power barge and a yard ferry, to Okinawa. She completed that run at Buckner Bay on 22 May; assisted in downing an enemy bomber the next day; and, at the end of the month, departed for Ulithi and the Philippines. From the former, she towed an oil barge and two lighters to the latter, arriving in San Pedro Bay, Leyte, on 27 June.

Then ordered east, the ocean-going, auxiliary tug cleared San Pedro Bay in mid-July and entered San Francisco Bay on 17 August, two days after the cessation of hostilities in the Pacific. Overhaul took her into September; and, on the 12th, she resumed towing activities with a run from Astoria, Oregon, to Pearl Harbor. During October, she delivered barracks ships to Eniwetok. In November, she commenced target towing services for surface and aviation units training in Hawaiian waters.

ATA-187 received one battle star for her World War II service.

=== Post war ===
In April 1946, she completed a run between Hawaii and California; then returned to Hawaii to prepare for Operation Crossroads, the atomic bomb test series scheduled for the summer at Bikini. In May, the ATA joined Joint Task Force I and moved into the Marshalls, where, into the fall, she provided towing services. On 26 November 1946, the tug received final radiological clearance and headed for New Orleans, her new home port.

On 20 January 1947, the ATA, arrived at New Orleans, her base for the next 14 years. On 16 July 1948, the ship was named Salish in honor of the Salish tribe. During that period, towing activities, for the active and reserve fleets, took her between Gulf, east coast, and Caribbean ports. Support operations saw her off the Texas coast for radio experiments run by the University of Texas between July and September 1947; off the Virginia Capes and in the British West Indies for survey and cable laying operations from June to December 1956 and from October to December 1959; in the Bahamas for mooring operations in May and June 1959; and in the Bermuda Islands for cable laying operations from June to September 1960.

In July 1961, Salish was transferred to the east coast and, for the next ten years, was homeported at Mayport, Florida. From there, she continued her diverse towing operations; but, was assigned, more frequently than before, to support experimental projects, including the MONOB I and R/P FLIP projects, and to cable-laying and mooring operations off the Florida coast, in the Bermuda area, and in the Caribbean.

Ready for rescue and assistance operations throughout her career, she was herself the recipient of aid in October 1963 when she was damaged by Hurricane Ginny while towing a destroyer escort. Relieved of her tow by a Coast Guard tug, she underwent repairs and, in November, resumed her services to the fleet. Two of her most notable salvage missions came in April 1966 and in January 1971. During the first, she assisted fire-fighting and salvage operations for MV Viking Princess which was located, on fire and drifting, in the Windward Passage. The second involved the storm damaged Brazilian freighter, Amazonia, loaded with lye, malt, raw plastics, bulk newsprint, and heavy mining equipment. For the latter operation, conducted off Bermuda, she was awarded the Meritorious Unit Commendation.

In November 1971, Salish returned to Mayport from three weeks duty providing services to Fleet Training Group, Guantanamo Bay, Cuba, and prepared for transfer to the Argentine Navy. She was decommissioned on 10 February 1972.

== Argentine Navy service ==
In 1972, the ship was acquired by the Argentine Navy and commissioned as the ARA Alférez Sobral (A-9). She served during the 1982 Falklands War. While searching for the crew of a downed Argentinian English Electric Canberra on the night of 2 May, she was attacked by two Royal Navy Lynx helicopters that fired four Sea Skua missiles at her, killing eight crewmembers. The Alférez Sobral, grievously damaged and unable to find the crew, returned to Puerto Deseado two days later and remained in port for the rest of the conflict. In August 2018, it was announced that the ship will be retired from service and will be kept as a museum ship in the city of Santa Fe. However, after several years at dock, Alférez Sobral was expended as target off Mar del Plata on 21 May 2025, shelled by the aviso ARA Puerto Argentino.
