= ARA Gómez Roca =

Espora-class corvette of the Argentine Navy

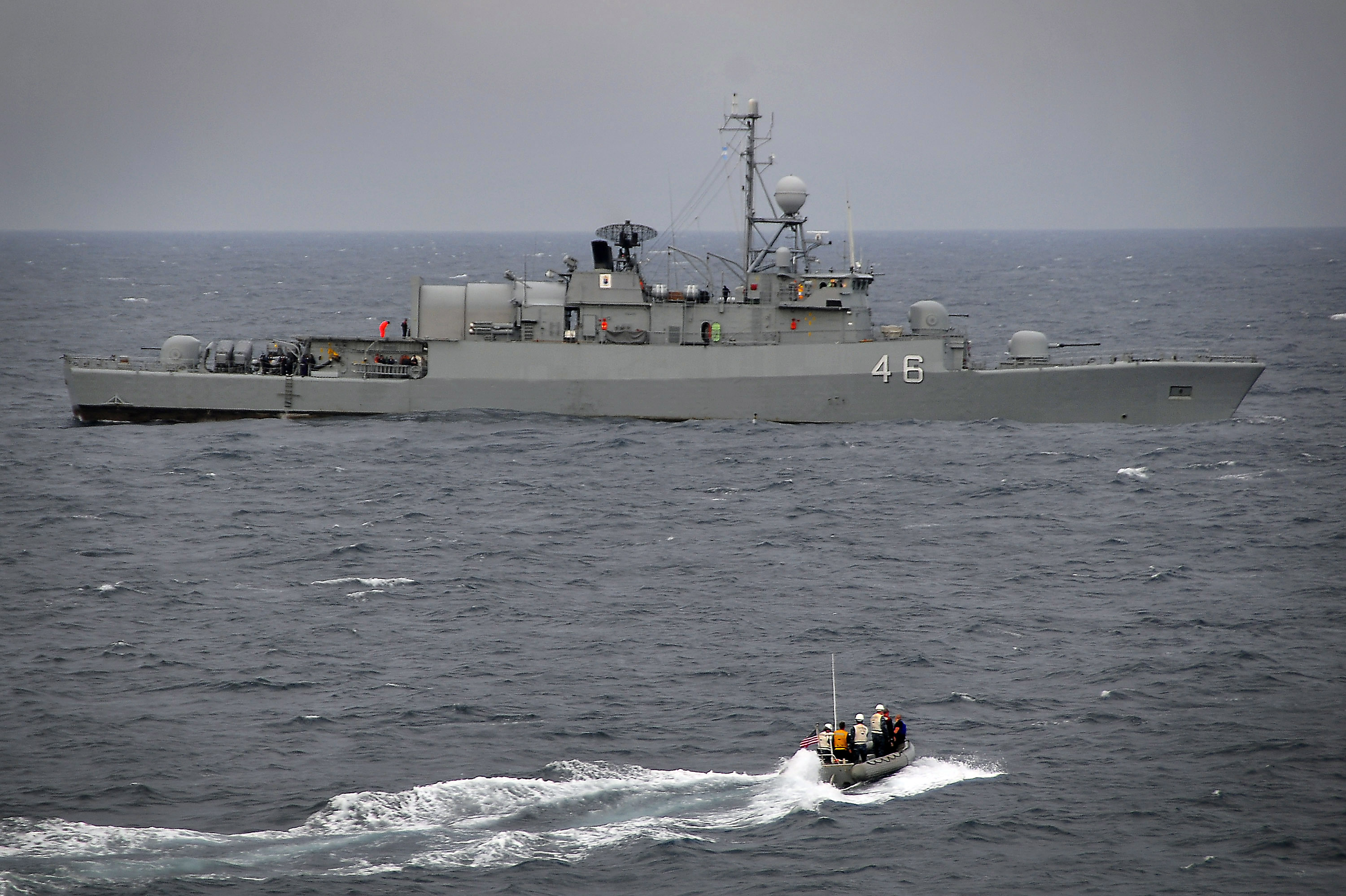
- Espora-class corvette ARA Gómez Roca (P-46)

History

Argentina
- Name: Gómez Roca
- Namesake: Sergio Gómez Roca
- Builder: Astilleros y Fábricas Navales del Estado, Ensenada, Buenos Aires Province
- Laid down: 7 June 1983
- Launched: 14 November 1984
- Commissioned: 17 May 2004
- Status: Active

General characteristics
- Class & type: Espora-class corvette
- Displacement: 1,560 tons (1,790 tons full load)
- Length: 91.2 m (299 ft)
- Beam: 11.0 m (36.1 ft)
- Draught: 3.33 m (10.9 ft) (hull)
- Installed power: 22,600 bhp (16.9 MW)
- Propulsion: 2 × SEMT Pielstick 16 PC 2-5 V400 diesels, 2 × 5-blade props
- Speed: 27 knots (50 km/h)
- Range: 4,000 nautical miles (7,410 km) at 18 knots (33 km/h)
- Complement: 11 officers, 46 petty officers, 36 enlisted
- Sensors & processing systems: Thales DA-05/2 air/surface search; Thales WM-28, LIROD fire control; Consilium Selesmar NavBat; Atlas AQS-1 hull MF sonar
- Electronic warfare & decoys: Decca RDC-2ABC; Decca RCM-2 jammer; 2 × Matra Dagaie decoys
- Armament: 4 × MM38 Exocet anti-ship missiles; 1 × 76 mm/62 OTO Melara dual purpose gun; 2 × DARDO twin 40 mm AA guns; 2 × .50cal machine guns; 2 × triple 324 mm ILAS-3 tubes (WASS A-244S torpedoes)
- Aircraft carried: 1 × Eurocopter Fennec
- Aviation facilities: Helideck and telescoping hangar

ARA Gómez Roca (P-46) is the sixth and last ship of the MEKO 140A16 Espora class of six corvettes built in Germany for the Argentine Navy. The ship is the first ship to bear the name of Frigate Captain Sergio Gómez Roca, who commanded the Argentine patrol ship ARA Alferez Sobral during the Falklands War and died in action when the ship was attacked by Royal Navy helicopters. Originally the ship was to have been named Seaver after Captain Benjamin Seaver, a US-born naval hero of the Argentine War of Independence.

== Origin ==
Gómez Roca and her sister ships were part of the 1974 Naval Constructions National Plan, an initiative by the Argentine Navy to replace old World War II-vintage ships with more advanced warships. The original plan called for six MEKO 360H2 destroyers, four of them to be built in Argentina, but the plan was later modified to include four MEKO destroyers and six corvettes for anti-surface warfare and patrol operations.

== Construction ==
Gómez Roca was constructed at the Río Santiago Shipyards of the Astilleros y Fábricas Navales del Estado (State Shipyards and Naval Factories) state corporation. Her keel was laid down on 7 June 1983 and was launched on 14 November 1984. Fitting out of Gómez Roca and her sister ship Robinson was suspended in 1992, briefly resumed in July 1994 and finally started again on 18 July 1997. Following the resumption of construction, the ship was delivered to the Navy in 2004 and commissioned in 2005.

Both Robinson and Gómez Roca benefitted from their construction delay with better automation, communication and electronic systems than their four sister ships. As with Parker and Robinson, Gómez Roca is fitted with a telescopic hangar.

== Service history ==
Following her commissioning Gómez Roca participated in several naval exercises and conducted fishery patrol duties in the Argentine exclusive economic zone.

She is homeported at Puerto Belgrano Naval Base and is part of the Navy's 2nd Corvette Division with her five sister ships.

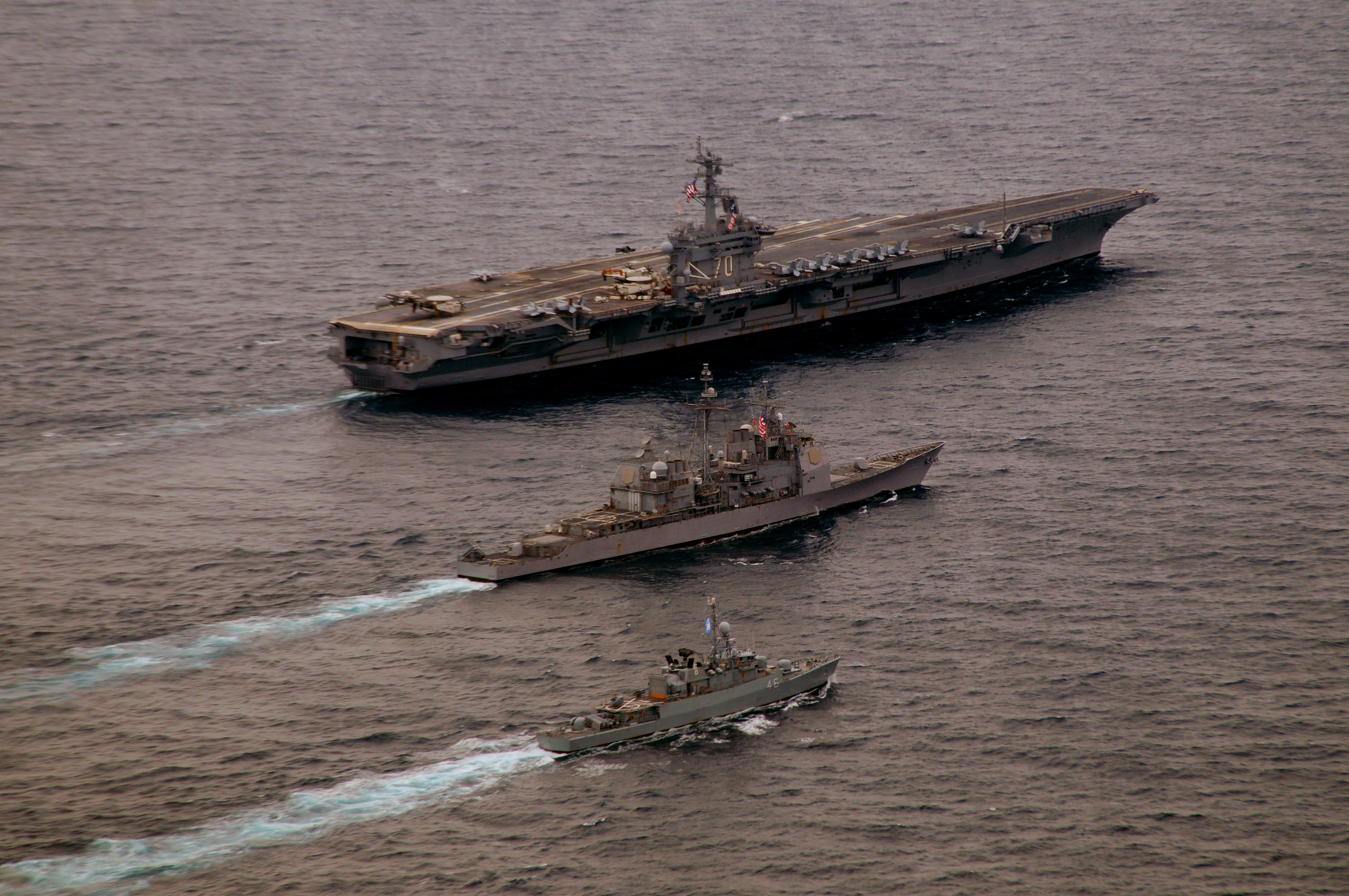
Gómez Roca participating in Gringo-Gaucho exercises 2010

In March 2010, she operated with USS Carl Vinson during the Gringo-Gaucho / Southern Seas 2010 exercises as the aircraft carrier transited around South America to her new home base at San Diego.

As of 2021 Gómez Roca remained active and, in September, participated in a sea exercise also involving her sister ships Espora, Robinson and Spiro, along with the destroyer Sarandi. In October 2024, Gómez Roca was reported to have engaged in an exercise with her sister ships Espora, Rosales and Robinson as well as with the destroyers La Argentina, Almirante Brown, and Sarandí and with several other vessels.
