= ARA Parker (P-44) =

Espora-class corvette of the Argentine Navy

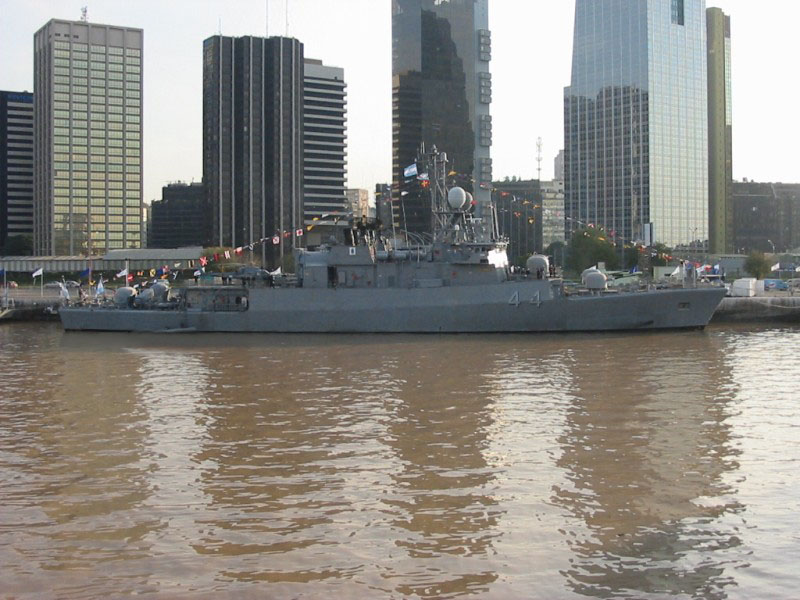
- Espora-class corvette ARA Parker

History

Argentina
- Name: Parker
- Namesake: Enrique Guillermo Parker
- Builder: Río Santiago Shipyard
- Launched: 30 March 1984
- Acquired: 2 April 1990
- Commissioned: 17 April 1990
- Home port: Puerto Belgrano
- Identification: Pennant number: P-44
- Status: Inactive; future status unclear

General characteristics
- Class & type: MEKO 140A16 Espora-class corvette
- Displacement: 1,560 tons (1,790 tons full load)
- Length: 91.2 m (299 ft 3 in)
- Beam: 11.0 m (36 ft 1 in)
- Draught: 3.33 m (10 ft 11 in) (hull)
- Installed power: 22,600 bhp (16.9 MW)
- Propulsion: 2 × SEMT Pielstick 16 PC 2-5 V400 diesels, 2 × 5-blade props
- Speed: 27 knots (50 km/h; 31 mph)
- Range: 4,000 nautical miles (7,410 km; 4,600 mi) at 18 knots (33 km/h; 21 mph)
- Crew: 11 officers, 46 petty officers, 36 enlisted
- Sensors & processing systems: Thales DA-05/2 air/surface search; Thales WM-28, LIROD fire control; Decca TM 1226 navigation; Atlas AQS-1 hull MF sonar
- Electronic warfare & decoys: Decca RDC-2ABC; Decca RCM-2 jammer; 2 × Matra Dagaie decoys
- Armament: 4 × MM38 Exocet anti-ship missiles (removed during 2021-24 refit); 1 × 76 mm/62 OTO Melara dual purpose gun; 2 × DARDO twin 40 mm AA guns; 2 × .50 cal machine guns; 2 × triple 324 mm ILAS-3 tubes (WASS A-244S torpedoes)
- Aircraft carried: 1 × Eurocopter Fennec
- Aviation facilities: Helideck and telescoping hangar

ARA Parker (P-44) is the fourth ship of the MEKO 140A16 Espora class of six corvettes built for the Argentine Navy. The ship is the second ship to bear the name of Captain Enrique Guillermo Parker, who fought in the Argentine Navy as its second-in-command during the Cisplatine War.

The Argentine Navy struggles to meet maintenance and training requirements because of financial problems and import restrictions. The status of Parker was not clear, as of November 2012 she was waiting for spares. As of 2021, Parker was scheduled for repair work, and conversion to the offshore patrol role, at the Tandanor state-owned shipyard in Buenos Aires. The work to convert the ship to her new role had been expected to last through 2023. However, as of late 2024 the status of the conversion was unclear and the ship was effectively inactive.

== Origin ==
Parker and her sister ships were part of the 1974 Naval Constructions National Plan, an initiative by the Argentine Navy to replace old World War II-vintage ships with more advanced warships. The original plan called for six MEKO 360H2 destroyers, four of them to be built in Argentina, but the plan was later modified to include four MEKO destroyers and six corvettes for anti-surface warfare and patrol operations.

== Construction ==
Espora was constructed at the Río Santiago Shipyard of the Astilleros y Fábricas Navales del Estado (State Shipyards and Naval Factories) state corporation. She was launched on 30 March 1984, but flooding on 2 October 1986 delayed completion. In 1988 her pennant number was changed from P-13 to P-44 in line with the rest of the class. She was officially delivered to the Navy on 2 April 1990 and commissioned on 17 April of that year.

Parker is the first ship of the class' second batch, and incorporated a telescopic hangar, allowing the ship to carry a helicopter. The first three ships of the class were fitted with a landing pad but did not have a hangar.

== Service history ==
Between 1990 and 2000, Parker was effectively the last ship of her class, as budgetary cuts delayed and almost cancelled the construction of the final two ships, Robinson and Gómez Roca. Following her commissioning Parker participated in several naval exercises and conducted fishery patrol duties in the Argentine exclusive economic zone.

In 1995 she represented the Argentine Navy in the Naval Parade conducted in Cape Town as part of the celebrations of the 75th anniversary of the South African Navy.

She is homeported at Puerto Belgrano Naval Base and is part of the 2nd Corvette Division with her five sister ships.

Parker had been planned for conversion to the offshore patrol role at the Tandanor shipyard. For that role, a hydraulic crane was installed to permit the deployment of 5.5-metre (18 ft) semi-rigid fast boats while space, previously used for the storage of MM38 Exocet missiles, was converted into extra personnel accommodation space. The work had been scheduled for completion by the end of 2023. However, the work was reported to be in limbo as of late-2024. By mid-2025 it was reported that the planned conversion had been cancelled with the ship's future status unclear.
