= Port Belgrano Naval Base =

Argentine Navy base

- Punta Alta, Buenos Aires Province, Argentina; Near Bahia Blanca
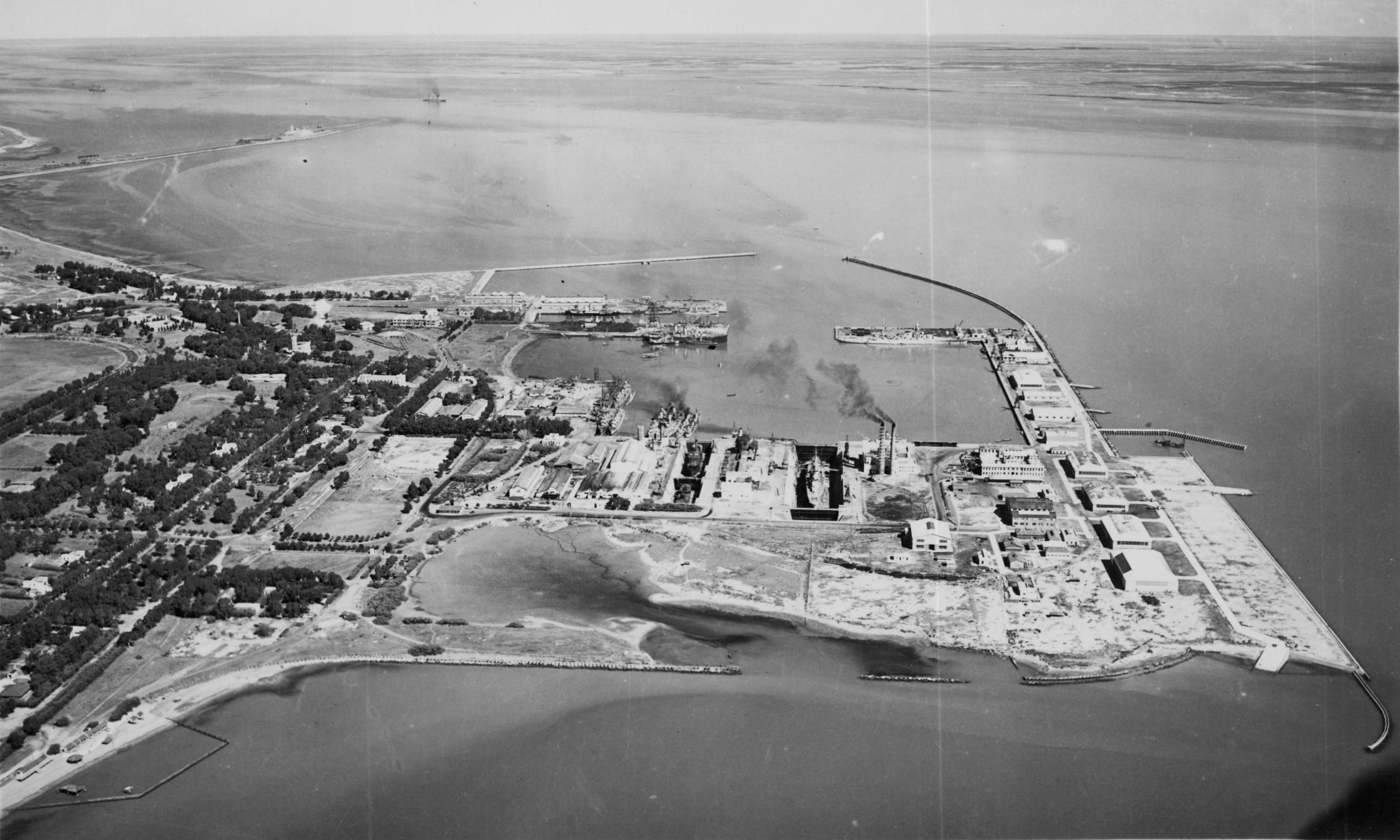
- Aerial view of Puerto Belgrano, 1943

Site information
- Type: Naval base
- Operator: Argentine Navy
- Condition: Operational

Location
- Location in Argentina
- Coordinates: 38°53′13″S 62°05′52″W
- Area: 122 hectares (300 acres)

Site history
- Built: 1896
- In use: 1896 – present

Port Belgrano Naval Base (Spanish: Base Naval Puerto Belgrano - BNPB) is the largest naval base of the Argentine Navy, situated next to Punta Alta, near Bahía Blanca, about 560 km (348 mi) south of Buenos Aires. It is named after the brigantine General Belgrano (named after Manuel Belgrano) which sounded the area in late 1824.

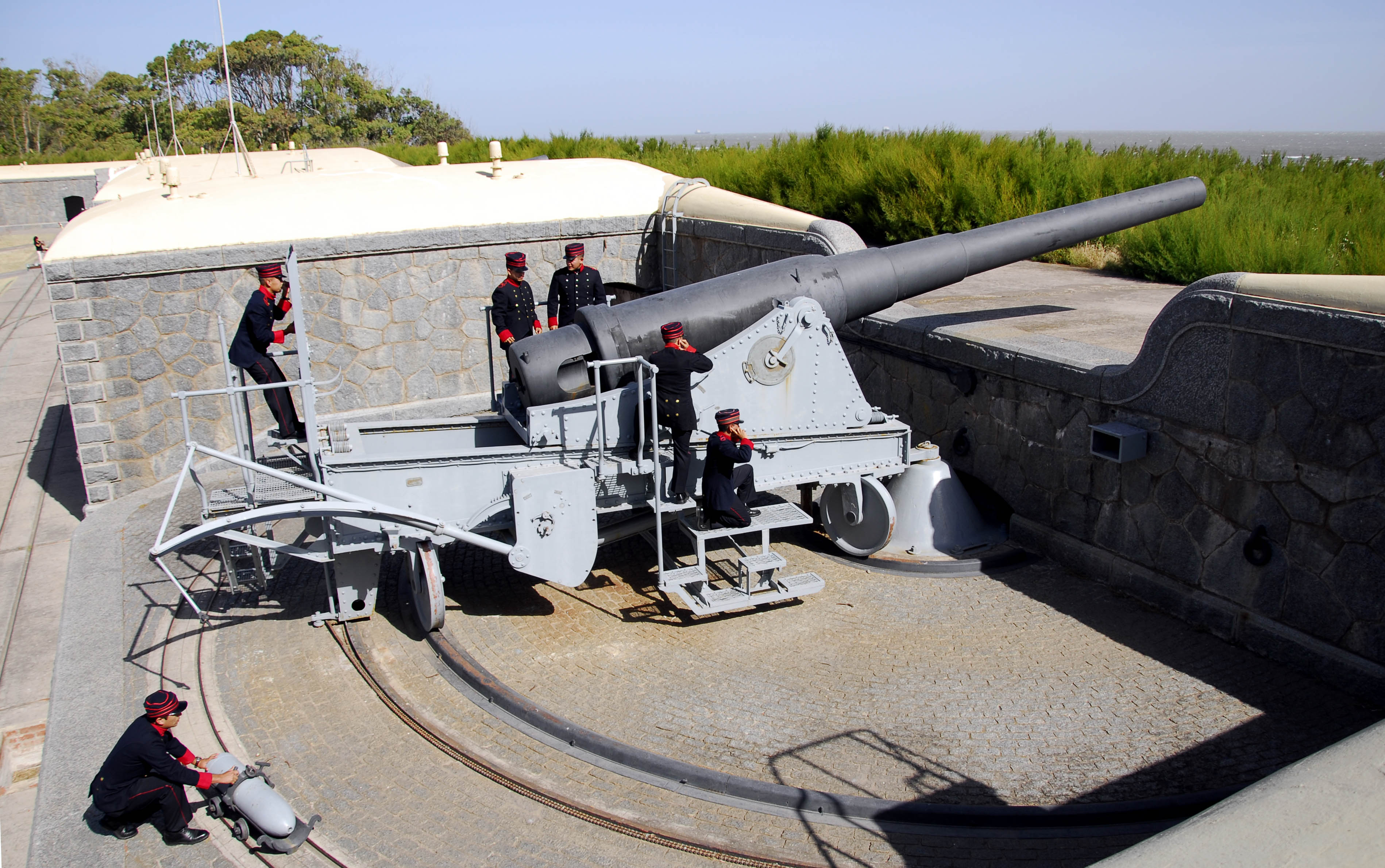
Krupp 240mm gun, Battery nº 4, Puerto Belgrano

Home of the Argentine Seas Fleet ((in Spanish) Flota de Mar), it concentrates the major ships and arsenals; and is close to the main bases of other Argentine Navy organisations: Marine's camp Baterías and Naval aviation's air base Comandante Espora (Spanish: Base Aeronaval Comandante Espora - BACE) .

== History ==
Designed by Italian engineer Luis Luiggi, Puerto Belgrano opened on November 30, 1896, under the name Puerto Militar (English: Military Port). In 1911, the French-owned railway company Ferrocarril Rosario y Puerto Belgrano opened a broad gauge (5 feet 7 inches (1.70 m)) line between Puerto Belgrano and Rosario. The harbor was renamed Puerto Belgrano in 1923.

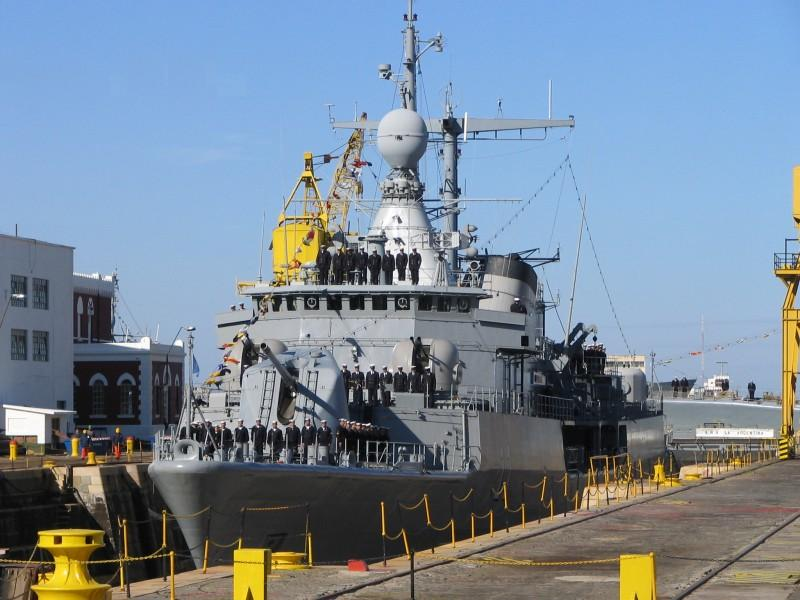
ARA La Argentina, docked at Puerto Belgrano.

The base grew in importance with the size of the fleet. During World War I and World War II the Rivadavia-class battleships ARA Moreno and ARA Rivadavia were docked here, and during the Cold War the aircraft carriers ARA Independencia and ARA Veinticinco de Mayo were docked at this base.

The shipyard continues doing maintenance and refits of vessels and submarines.

In April 2006, the Royal Navy's Antarctic patrol vessel HMS Endurance entered Puerto Belgrano for repairs after damaging its rudder while in Antarctica in February. It was the first time since the end of the 1982 Falklands War (Spanish: Guerra de las Malvinas) that a British Royal Navy ship had entered the Argentine naval base.

== Facilities ==
The base contains a naval hospital, specialized workshops, public schools, six middle and tertiary level military schools, and seven residential neighborhoods for naval personnel, the newsroom of the magazine "Gaceta Marinera", the "Stella Maris" Catholic parish, a civil registry, post office, a museum, and a hotel among other facilities. All of them surround the quays and drywalls that were proposed by the ship's captain Félix Dufourq, who carried out many of the studies aimed at finding the most suitable place for the construction of the naval facilities.

== Based ships ==
=== Destroyers ===
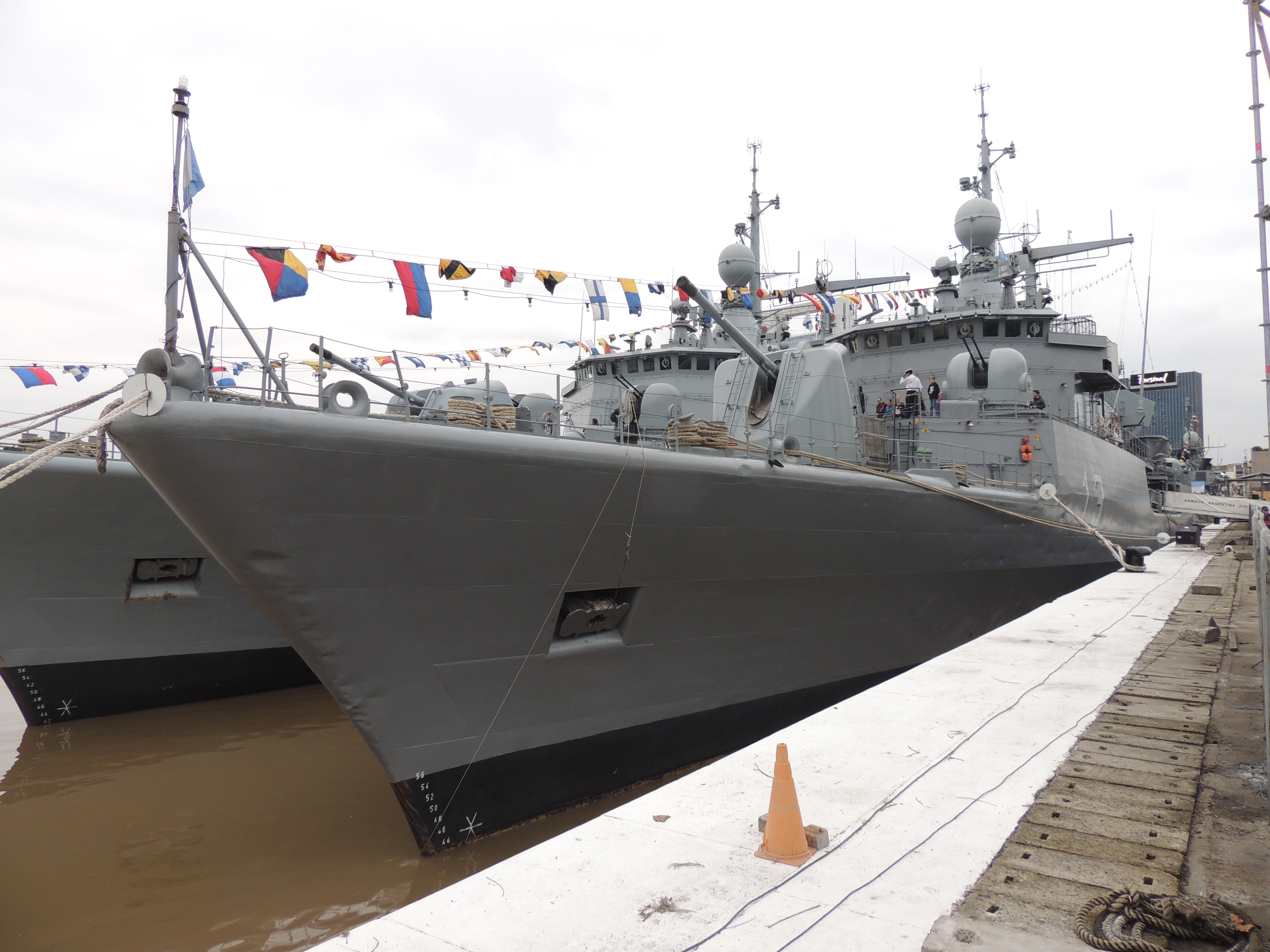
ARA Sarandí and ARA Almirante Brown in 2017.

- ARA Almirante Brown (D-10)
- ARA La Argentina (D-11)
- ARA Sarandí (D-13)

=== Corvettes ===
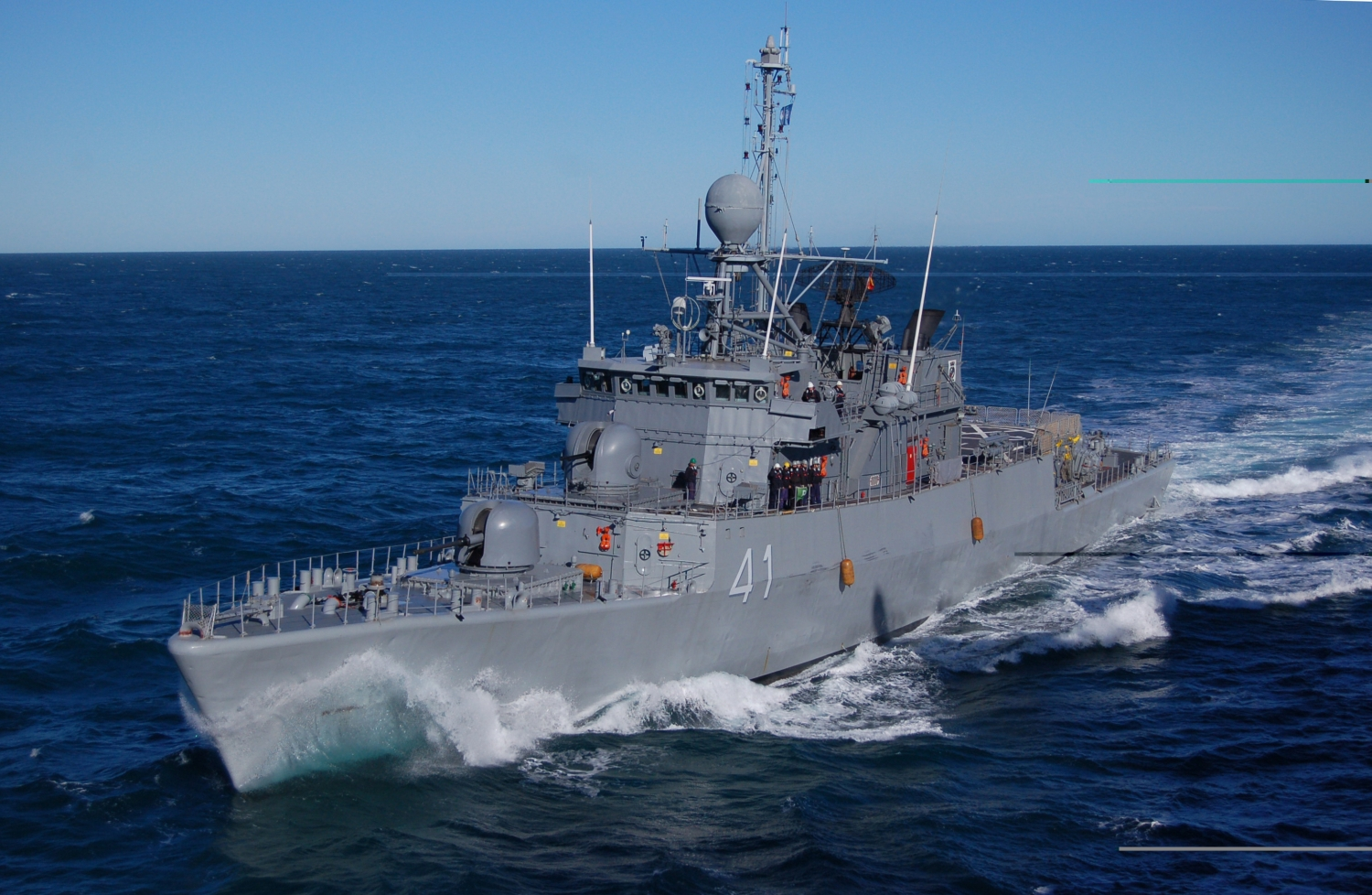
ARA Espora, the lead ship of the Espora Class Corvettes.

- ARA Espora (P-41)
- ARA Rosales (P-42)
- ARA Spiro (P-43)
- ARA Parker (P-44)
- ARA Robinson (P-45)
- ARA Gómez Roca (P-46)

=== Auxiliaries and Amphibious ===
- ARA Patagonia (B-1)
- ARA Canal Beagle (B-3)
- ARA Bahía San Blas (B-4)
- ARA Puerto Argentino (A-21)
- ARA Estrecho de San Carlos (A-22)
- ARA Islas Malvinas (A-24)
- ARA Teniente Olivieri (A-2)
- ARA Punta Alta (Q-63)

=== Antarctic Naval Command ===
- ARA Almirante Irízar

=== Tugships ===
- ARA Querandí (R-2)
- ARA Tehuelche (R-3)
- ARA Mataco (R-4)
- ARA Mocoví (R-5)
- ARA Zeus (R-9)

== Centro Espacial Manuel Belgrano (CEMB) ==
A launch pad is planned Argentine space launch vehicle "Tronador II", named Centro Espacial Manuel Belgrano (CEMB) at 38.9628°S 61.715°W. Land for the construction of the facilities were ceded to CONAE (Argentine Space Agency). The location was selected because of existing Navy facilities, security measures already in place, large enough available area, and a favorable location for launches into polar orbits.

== See also ==
- List of shipyards of Argentina
- Mar del Plata Naval Base
- Ushuaia Naval Base
- Falklands Naval Station
