= ARA Spiro (P-43) =

Espora-class corvette of the Argentine Navy

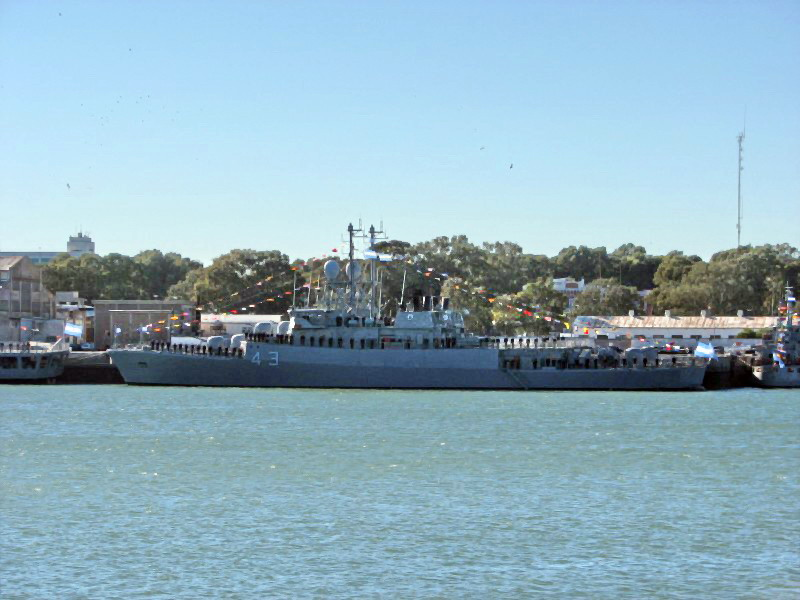
- Espora-class corvette ARA Spiro (P-43) moored in Puerto Belgrano naval base

History

Argentina
- Name: Spiro
- Namesake: Samuel Spiro
- Builder: Río Santiago Shipyard
- Laid down: 1 April 1982
- Launched: 24 June 1983
- Acquired: 24 November 1987
- Commissioned: 9 May 1988
- Home port: Puerto Belgrano
- Status: Active

General characteristics
- Class & type: MEKO 140A16 Espora-class corvette
- Displacement: 1,560 tons (1,790 tons full load)
- Length: 91.2 m (299 ft)
- Beam: 11.0 m (36.1 ft)
- Draught: 3.33 m (10.9 ft) (hull)
- Installed power: 22,600 bhp (16.9 MW)
- Propulsion: 2 × SEMT Pielstick 16 PC 2-5 V400 diesels, 2 × 5-blade props
- Speed: 27 knots (50 km/h)
- Range: 4,000 nautical miles (7,410 km) at 18 knots (33 km/h)
- Crew: 11 officers, 46 petty officers, 36 enlisted
- Sensors & processing systems: Thales DA-05/2 air/surface search; Thales WM-28, LIROD fire control; Decca TM 1226 navigation; Atlas AQS-1 hull MF sonar
- Electronic warfare & decoys: Decca RDC-2ABC; Decca RCM-2 jammer; 2 × Matra Dagaie decoys
- Armament: 4 × MM38 Exocet anti-ship missiles; 1 × 76 mm/62 OTO Melara dual purpose gun; 2 × DARDO twin 40 mm AA guns; 2 × .50cal machine guns; 2 × triple 324 mm ILAS-3 tubes (WASS A-244S torpedoes)
- Aviation facilities: Helideck for Eurocopter Fennec

ARA Spiro (P-43) is the third ship of the MEKO 140A16 Espora class of six corvettes built for the Argentine Navy. The ship is the second ship to bear the name of the Greek-born Captain Samuel Spiro, who fought during the Argentine War of Independence and blew himself up with his ship rather than surrender to the Spanish forces following the battle of Arroyo de la China, in 1814.

She is homeported at Puerto Belgrano Naval Base and is part of the Navy's 2nd Corvette Division with her five sister ships.

== Construction ==
Spiro and her sister ships were part of the 1974 Naval Constructions National Plan, an initiative by the Argentine Navy to replace old World War II-vintage ships with more advanced warships. The original plan called for six MEKO 360H2 destroyers, four of them to be built in Argentina, but the plan was later modified to include four MEKO destroyers and six corvettes for anti-surface warfare and patrol operations.

Spiro was constructed at the Río Santiago Shipyard of the Astilleros y Fábricas Navales del Estado (State Shipyards and Naval Factories) state corporation. Her keel was laid down on 2 October 1982, and was launched on 24 June 1983. The ship was officially delivered to the Navy on 26 November 1987, and formally commissioned on 9 May 1988.

== Service history ==
On 25 September 1990, Spiro and the destroyer Almirante Brown participated as part of a multinational task force in the United Nations-mandated blockade of Iraq following its invasion of Kuwait. She participated in patrol and escort missions as part of Operations Desert Shield and Desert Storm, returning to Argentina on 30 May 1991.

Spiro also participated in several naval exercises and conducted fishery patrol duties in the Argentine exclusive economic zone, capturing three illegal fishing ships between 1991 and 1994.

In August 2012 she ran aground on a sandbank as she left Mar del Plata and lost her sonar. This meant that her sister ARA Espora had to make an unscheduled deployment to replace Spiro on the Atlasur IX exercise off West Africa. Having left port with unresolved problems in her generators, Espora ended up spending 73 days in South Africa after three generators failed completely and Argentina struggled to find the money to repair them.

In 2021, Spiro was reported active and, in September, participated in a sea exercise also involving her sister ships Espora, Robinson and Gómez Roca, along with the destroyer Sarandí.
