= Samuel Spiro =

Argentine Navy commander (fl. early 19th century)

- Born: 18th century Hydra, Ottoman Empire (now Greece)
- Died: 28 March 1814; Concepción del Uruguay, United Provinces of South America (now Argentina)
- Organization: Argentine Navy
- Title: Captain

Miguel Samuel Spiro was a naval commander of the Argentine Navy born in Hydra Island, Ottoman Empire, in modern day Greece. He emigrated to Buenos Aires with his two brothers in 1810, and was an early supporter of the May Revolution.

He had been a Navy Captain in Greece, and took part in organizing the fledgling naval forces of the United Provinces of South America.

Spiro was one of the main Argentine navy commanders in the United Provinces' victory at Martin Garcia. He died on 28 March 1814 during the naval battle of Arroyo de la China, on the Uruguay River, near Concepción del Uruguay, when he decided to scuttle the yawl he was commanding rather than surrender her to the royalists. The royalist commander on chief, Jacinto de Romarate, claimed that the ship blew up after being hit by the guns of his flagship, the brigantine Belén.

The Argentine navy has named two ships in his honor, the most recent being the corvette ARA Spiro (P-43), commissioned in 1988.
