= ARA Teniente Olivieri =

Ship built in 1981

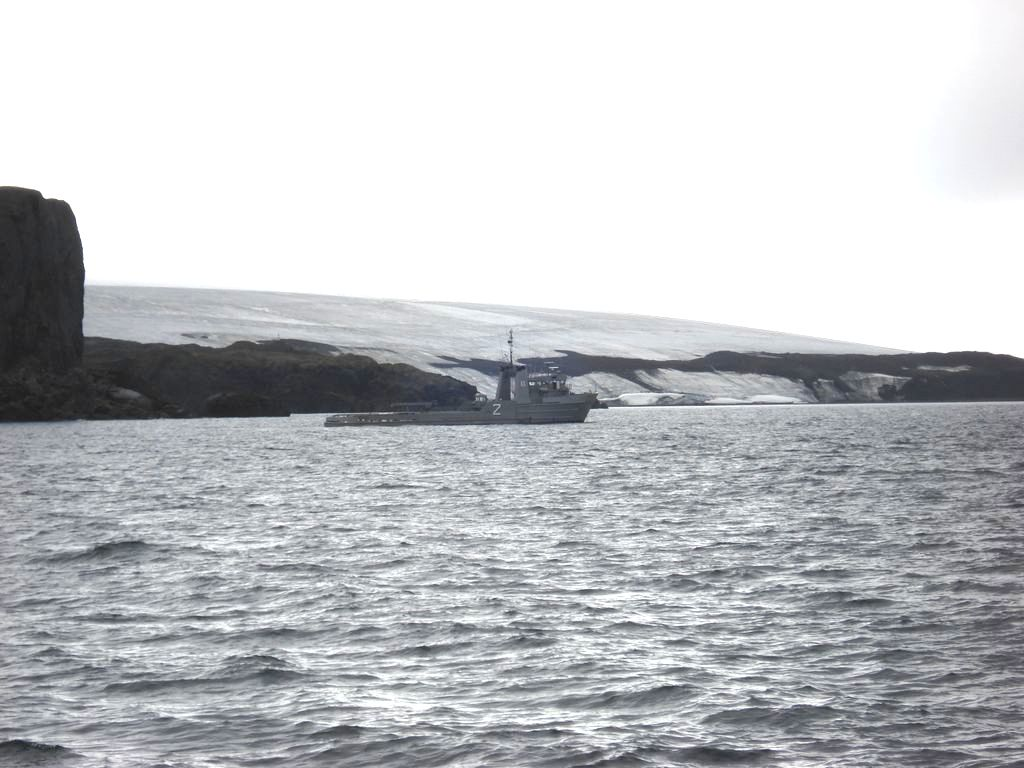
- Tte Olivieri departing Jubany base on Antarctica

History

Argentina
- Name: Teniente Olivieri
- Namesake: Lieutenant Olivieri
- Launched: 1981
- Identification: IMO number: 8107983
- Status: in active service

General characteristics
- Displacement: 1640 tons (full)
- Length: 56.3 m (185 ft)
- Beam: 12.2 m (40 ft)
- Draft: 4.3 m (14 ft)
- Propulsion: 2 × Diesel-electric engines, single screw
- Speed: 14 knots (26 km/h)
- Range: 2,800 mi (4,500 km) at 10 knots (19 km/h)
- Complement: 39
- Armament: 2 × 12.7mm machine-guns

The ARA Teniente Olivieri (A-2) is a ship in service with the Argentine Navy classified as an aviso.

Homebased at Ushuaia, she is normally assigned to operate in Antarctica during the summer campaigns in the Patrulla Antártica Naval Combinada (English: Joint Antarctic Naval Patrol) with the Chilean Navy to guarantee safety to all tourist and scientific ships that are in transit within the Antarctic Peninsula.

== Service ==
Built in 1981 as Marsea 10 by Quality Shipyard in New Orleans, USA as a support ship and tug for oil rigs.

In November 1987 was acquired by the U.S. Maritime Administration.

In Argentine service, she is the first ship to bear the name of Midshipman Olivieri killed on the ARA Alferez Sobral bridge during the Falklands War. The vessel was reported active as of 2022.
