= ARA Robinson (P-45) =

Espora-class corvette of the Argentine Navy

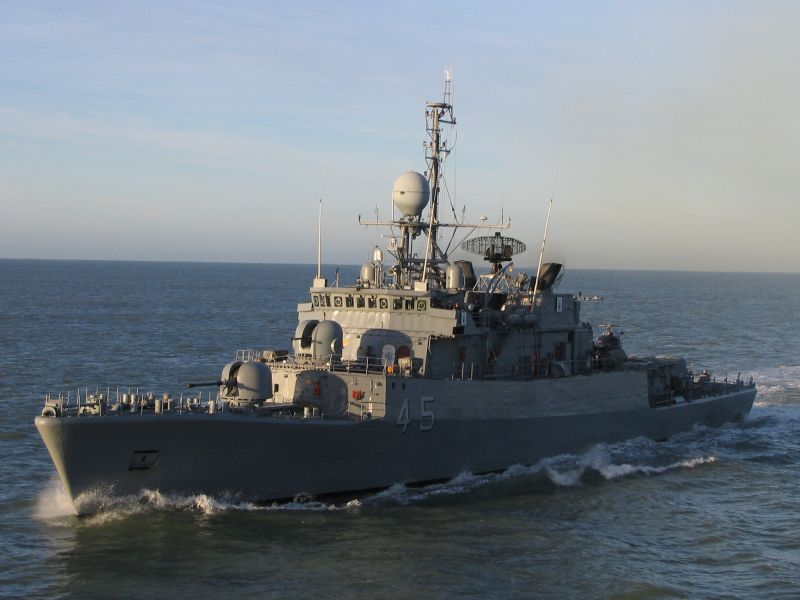
- The corvette ARA Robinson

History

Argentina
- Name: Robinson
- Namesake: Carlos Robinson
- Builder: Río Santiago Shipyard
- Laid down: 1 March 1983
- Launched: 25 November 1984
- Commissioned: 28 August 2000
- Home port: Puerto Belgrano
- Status: Active

General characteristics
- Class & type: MEKO 140A16 Espora-class corvette
- Displacement: 1,560 tons (1,790 tons full load)
- Length: 91.2 m (299 ft 3 in)
- Beam: 11.0 m (36 ft 1 in)
- Draught: 3.33 m (10 ft 11 in) (hull)
- Installed power: 22,600 bhp (16.9 MW)
- Propulsion: 2 × SEMT Pielstick 16 PC 2-5 V400 diesels, 2 × 5-blade props
- Speed: 27 knots (50 km/h)
- Range: 4,000 nautical miles (7,410 km) at 18 knots (33 km/h)
- Complement: 11 officers, 46 petty officers, 36 enlisted
- Sensors & processing systems: Thales DA-05/2 air/surface search; Thales WM-28, LIROD fire control; Consilium Selesmar NavBat; Atlas AQS-1 hull MF sonar
- Electronic warfare & decoys: Decca RDC-2ABC; Decca RCM-2 jammer; 2 × Matra Dagaie decoys
- Armament: 4 × MM38 Exocet anti-ship missiles; 1 × 76 mm/62 OTO Melara dual purpose gun; 2 × DARDO twin 40 mm AA guns; 2 × .50 cal machine guns; 2 × triple 324 mm ILAS-3 tubes (WASS A-244S torpedoes)
- Aircraft carried: 1 × Eurocopter Fennec
- Aviation facilities: Helideck and telescoping hangar

ARA Robinson (P-45) is the fifth ship of the MEKO 140A16 Espora class of six corvettes built for the Argentine Navy. The ship is the second ship to bear the name of British Captain Carlos Robinson, who fought in the Argentine Navy during the Cisplatine War and died commanding a squadron of gunboats during the Battle of La Colonia.

== Origin ==
Robinson and her sister ships were part of the 1974 Naval Constructions National Plan, an initiative by the Argentine Navy to replace old World War II-vintage ships with more advanced warships. The original plan called for six MEKO 360H2 destroyers, four of them to be built in Argentina, but the plan was later modified to include four MEKO destroyers and six corvettes for anti-surface warfare and patrol operations.

== Construction ==
Robinson was constructed at the Río Santiago Shipyard of the Astilleros y Fábricas Navales del Estado (State Shipyards and Naval Factories) state corporation. Her keel was laid down on 1 March 1983 and was launched on 25 November 1984. Fitting out of Robinson and her sister ship Gómez Roca was suspended in 1992, briefly resumed in July 1994 and finally started again on 18 July 1997. Following the resumption of construction, the ship was delivered to the Navy in 2000 and commissioned in 2000.

As part of the second batch of the class, Robinson is fitted with a telescopic hangar. All members of the class have the Thales DAISY combat system, but Robinson is the only one to have an indigenous command system as well. Along with Gómez Roca she has improved automation, communication and electronic systems compared to earlier members of the class.

== Service history ==
Following her commissioning Robinson participated in several naval exercises and conducted fishery patrol duties in the Argentine exclusive economic zone. She also accompanied the flagship of Irish Naval Service, LÉ Eithne, during her 2006 visit to Argentina. Robinson is homeported at Puerto Belgrano Naval Base and is part of the Navy's 2nd Corvette Division with her five sister ships.

In March 2021, the ship began a general maintenance refit at the Tandanor shipyard. In July 2021 the ARA Robinson entered service again. In September she participated in a sea exercise also involving her sister ships Espora, Spiro and Gómez Roca, along with the destroyer Sarandí. In 2022, she participated in an exercise off the coast of Mar del Plata with Sarandí, Espora, the corvette Rosales and the transport ship Canal Beagle. In April 2024, the corvette was reportedly engaged in sea training.

== Gallery ==
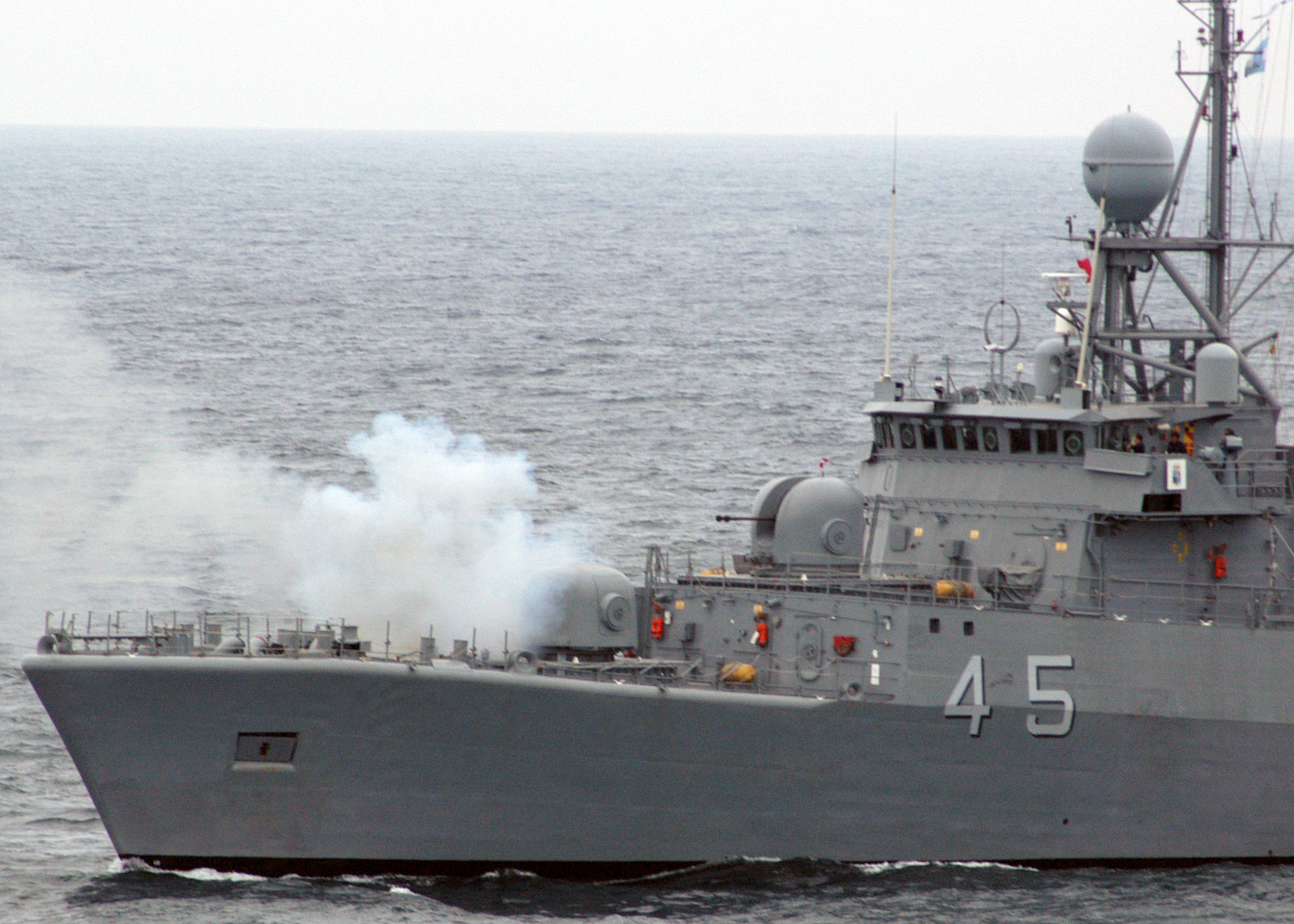
ARA Robinson fires her 3-inch gun during a surface gunnery exercise

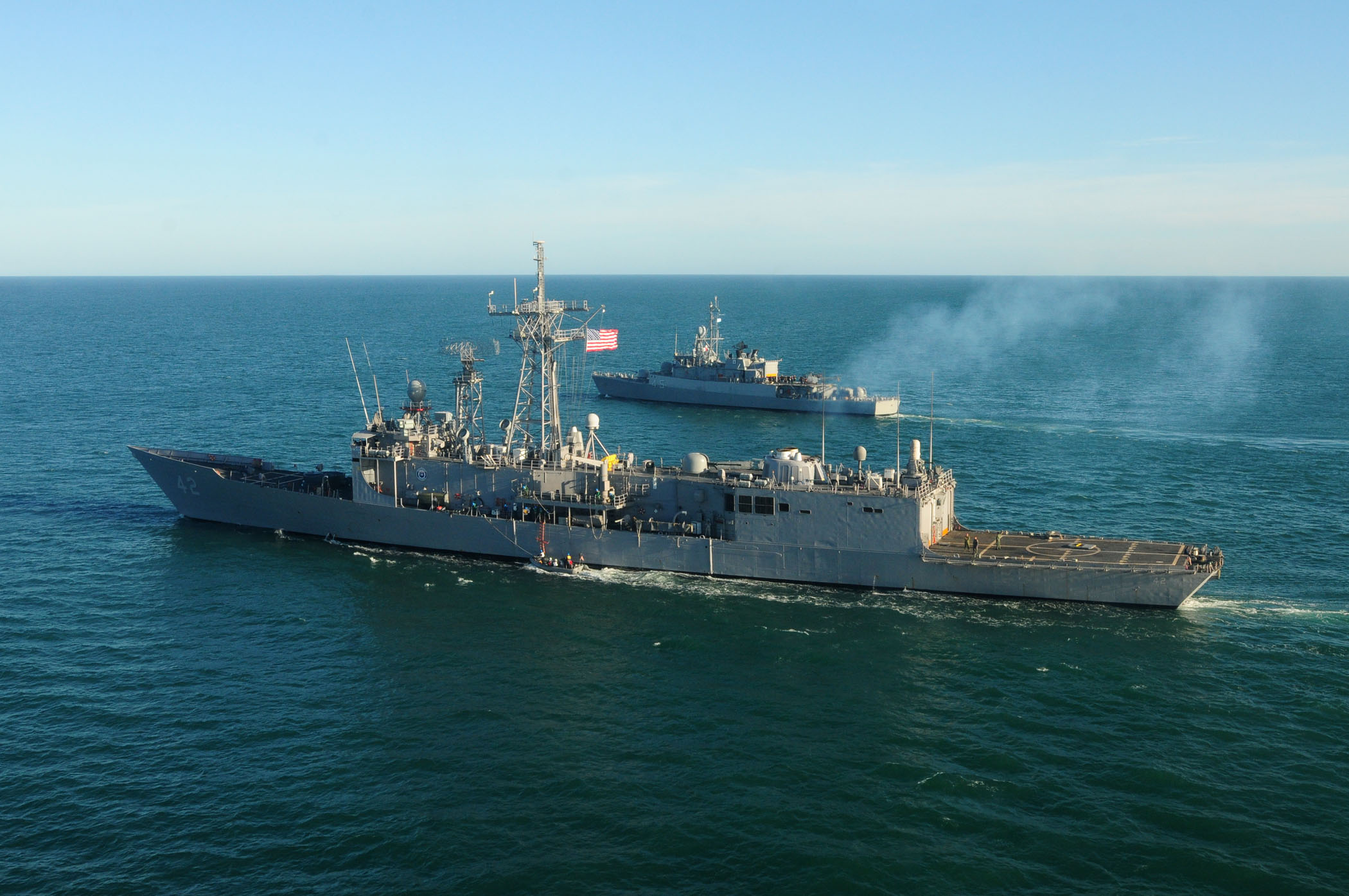
With USS Klakring during Southern Seas 2010
