= ARA Almirante Brown (D-10) =

1981 Almirante Brown-class destroyer

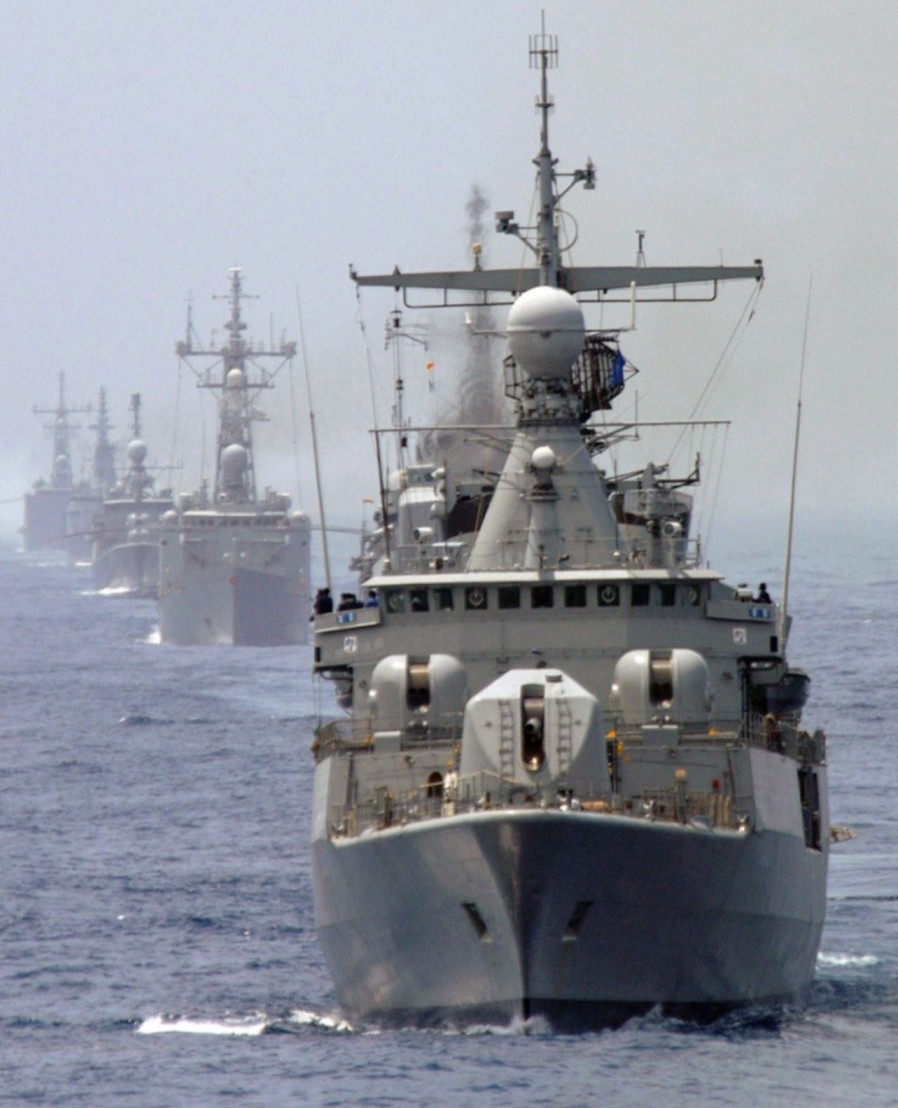
- ARA Almirante Brown leads in a formation during a leapfrog exercise

History

Argentina
- Name: Almirante Brown
- Namesake: Adm William Brown
- Builder: Blohm + Voss
- Laid down: September 8, 1980
- Launched: March 28, 1981
- Acquired: February 2, 1983
- Commissioned: March 28, 1983
- Status: in active service
- Notes: Pennant number: D-10

General characteristics
- Class & type: Almirante Brown-class destroyer
- Displacement: 3,360 tons
- Length: 126 m (413 ft)
- Beam: 14 m (46 ft)
- Draught: 5.8 m (19 ft)
- Propulsion: COGAG (4 turbines); 36,000 shp (27,000 kW)
- Speed: 30.5 kn (56.5 km/h)
- Range: 4,500 mi (7,200 km)
- Complement: 224
- Armament: 8 × Aérospatiale MM40 Exocet anti-ship missiles; 1 × Selenia/Elsag Albatross octuple launcher with 24 × Aspide surface-to-air missiles; 1 × Oto Melara 127 mm dual-purpose gun; 8 × Breda/Bofors 40 mm/70 anti-aircraft guns (4 × twin); 6 × 324 mm torpedo tubes (2 × triple)
- Aircraft carried: 1 Aérospatiale AS 555 Fennec helicopter
- Aviation facilities: Single hangar

ARA Almirante Brown (pennant number D-10) is the lead ship of the MEKO 360H2 series of four destroyers built for the Argentine Navy. The ship is the ninth ship in the history of the Argentine Navy to be named for Admiral William Brown, the founder and commander of the Argentine Navy during Argentina's war of independence against Spain.

== Construction ==
The keel of Almirante Brown was laid down on September 8, 1980, and she was launched on March 28, 1981. The ship was delivered to the Argentine Navy on February 2, 1983, for her sea trials, following which the ship departed for Argentina, arriving at Puerto Belgrano Naval Base on March 21 and being formally commissioned into the Navy on March 28 of that same year.

== Service history ==
Almirante Brown, together with the corvette ARA Spiro, was ordered to proceed to the Persian Gulf on September 25, 1990, as part of the United Nations-mandated naval blockade on Iraq following its invasion of Kuwait. The ship formed part of the multinational task force and participated on Operations Desert Shield and Desert Storm, returning to Argentina on April 25, 1991.

On April 16, 1996, Almirante Brown conducted the first trans-horizon launch of an Exocet MM-40 missile in the Argentine Navy.

Her home port is Puerto Belgrano, where the class of four ships (three vessels as of 2024) form part of the Navy's 2nd Destroyer Division.
