= Espora-class corvette =

Argentina naval class

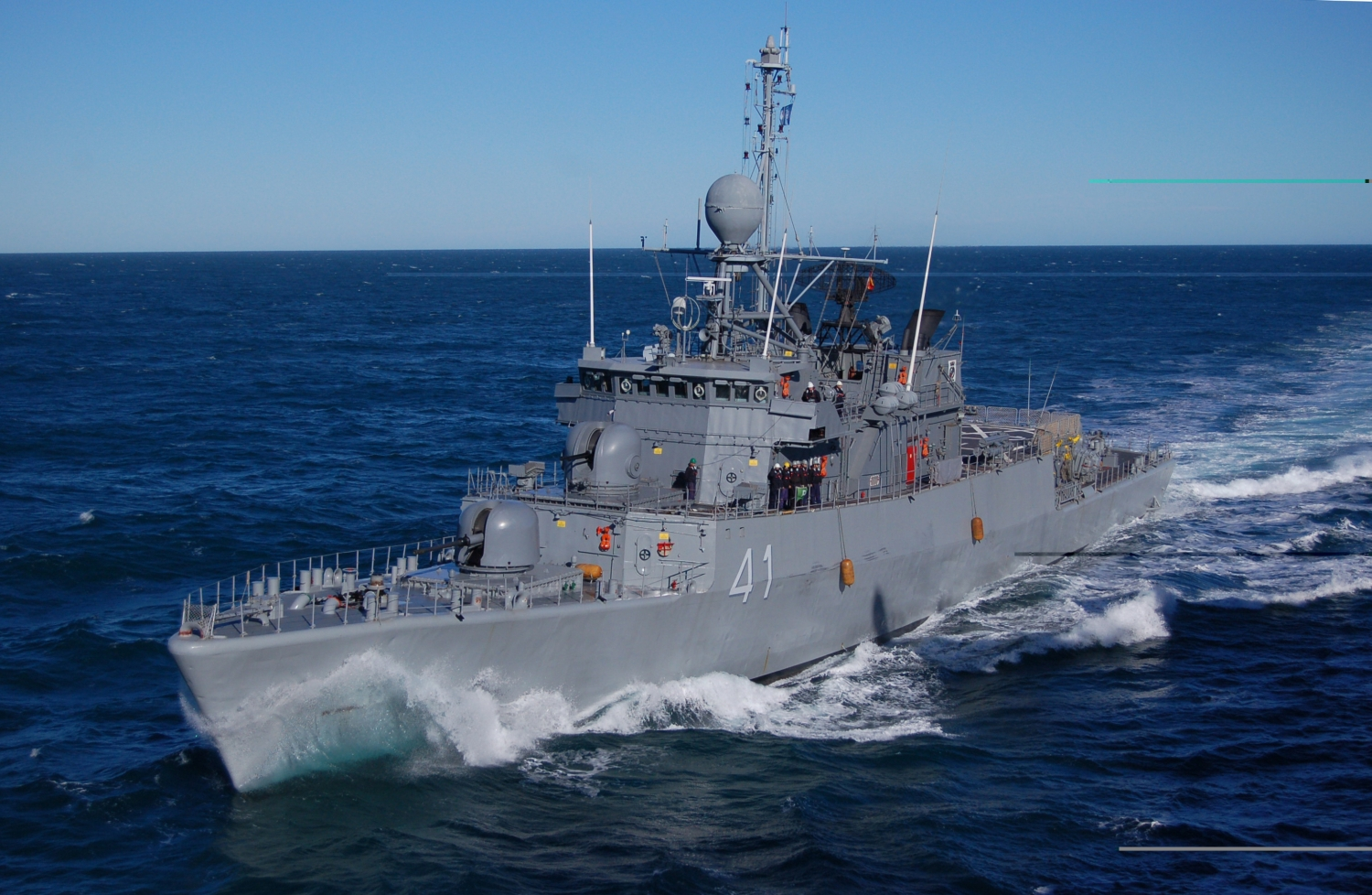
- ARA Espora

Class overview
- Builders: AFNE "Río Santiago"
- Operators: Argentine Navy
- Subclasses: Espora
- In commission: 1985–present
- Completed: 6

General characteristics
- Type: Corvette
- Displacement: 1,560 tons (1,790 tons full load)
- Length: 91.2 m (299 ft 3 in)
- Beam: 11.0 m (36 ft 1 in)
- Draught: 3.33 m (10 ft 11 in) (hull)
- Installed power: 22,600 bhp (16.9 MW)
- Propulsion: 2 × SEMT Pielstick 16 PC 2–5 V400 diesels, 2 × 5-blade props
- Speed: 27 knots (50 km/h; 31 mph)
- Range: 4,000 nmi (7,400 km; 4,600 mi) at 18 knots (33 km/h; 21 mph)
- Complement: 11 officers, 46 petty officers, 36 enlisted
- Sensors & processing systems: Thales DA-05/2 air/surface search; Thales WM-28, LIROD fire control; Decca TM 1226 navigation; (Consilium Selesmar NavBat on P45/6; Atlas AQS-1 hull MF sonar
- Electronic warfare & decoys: Decca RDC-2ABC; Decca RCM-2 jammer; 2 × Matra Dagaie decoys
- Armament: 4 × MM38 Exocet anti-ship missiles (removed from Parker); 1 × 76 mm/62 OTO Melara dual purpose gun; 2 × DARDO twin 40 mm AA guns; 2 × .50 cal machine guns; 2 × triple 324 mm ILAS-3 tubes (WASS A-244S torpedoes)
- Aircraft carried: 1 × Eurocopter Fennec (P44-P46)
- Aviation facilities: Helideck (all), telescoping hangar (P44-P46)

The Espora-class corvettes are six warships of the Argentine Navy built in Argentina to the German MEKO 140A16 design, this in turn being based on the Portuguese João Coutinho-class project. The first entered service in 1985 but accidents and lack of funds meant the last was not completed until 2004. The ships currently form the 2nd Corvette Division of the Argentine Navy and their home port is the Puerto Belgrano Naval Base. Although considered by its designers to be frigates, the Espora-class vessels have been classed in Argentina as corvettes.

The Argentine Navy struggles to meet maintenance and training requirements because of financial problems and import restrictions. The Espora class has not been immune – Espora herself spent 73 days in South Africa in late 2012 in a dispute about payment for repairs to its generators. The operational status of Rosales is not clear, as of November 2012 she was waiting for spares, whilst Spiro lost her sonar in a grounding accident in August 2012. In 2019, Rosales was reported as scheduled to be scrapped. However, one year later training activities were still being conducted on her and in 2021 she was undergoing repair work for an envisaged return to service in 2022. She returned to service in September 2022.

Parker was subsequently selected for conversion to the offshore patrol role and entered refit for that purpose in late 2021. Whilst initially planned to return to operational service in 2023, that work was reported to be in limbo as of late 2024.

== Construction ==
The 1974 Naval Constructions National Plan was an initiative by the Argentine Navy to replace old World War II-vintage ships with more advanced warships. The original plan called for six MEKO 360H2 destroyers, four of them to be built in Argentina, but the plan was later modified to include four MEKO destroyers built in Germany and six corvettes built in Argentina, for anti-surface warfare and patrol operations.

The ships were designed by the German shipyard Blohm + Voss as a development of the Portuguese Navy's João Coutinho-class corvettes, designed by the Portuguese naval engineer Rogério de Oliveira in the late 1960s. All the ships of the class were built in Argentina at the AFNE "Río Santiago" shipyard, close to the city of La Plata in Buenos Aires Province. The contract was signed on 1 August 1979 and the pennant numbers P10-P15 were assigned until they were changed to P41-P46 in 1988.

The first three (P-41-P-43) were commissioned between 1985 and 1987, but Parker was delayed until 1990 after flooding on 2 October 1986. Fitting out of Robinson and Gómez Roca was suspended in 1992, briefly restarted in July 1994 and resumed on 18 July 1997. These last two have improved automation, communication and electronics systems; along with Parker they have a telescopic hangar fitted. All members of the class have the Thales DAISY combat data system, but Robinson has an indigenous command system as well.

== Service history ==
Spiro and Rosales participated in the multinational task force blockading Iraq as part of Operations Desert Shield and Desert Storm in 1990/1991. The Esporas enforced the Argentine exclusive economic zone and captured a number of illegal fishing vessels in the early 1990s.

In August 2012 Spiro hit a sandbank as she left Mar del Plata and lost her sonar. This meant Espora had to make an unscheduled deployment to replace her in the Atlasur IX naval exercise off West Africa. Espora left home with unresolved problems in her generators, which became worse until she ended up in South Africa with three failed generators. The German manufacturers MTU refused to repair them without payment in advance since Argentina still owed them money for previous work, so Espora spent 73 days at Simonstown until the dispute was finally resolved and the repairs completed.

As of 2020 life extension programs for at least two units of the class were planned with work to be carried out at the Río Santiago Shipyard. This work might incorporate a conversion of the operational profile of two ships, possibly toward supporting offshore patrol missions. The first ship selected for conversion to the offshore patrol role was Parker, though as of mid-2025 plans for the ship were uncertain.

As of 2021, the corvettes Espora, Spiro, Robinson and Gómez Roca were all reported active and in September participated in a naval exercise also involving the destroyer Sarandí and aircraft from Argentine naval aviation.

In June 2024, the chief of the Argentine Navy, Rear-Admiral Carlos María Allievi, noted that only three of six Espora-class vessels were operational (Espora, Rosales and Robinson), with Parker in refit and the remaining two (Spiro and Gomez Roca) docked due to a shortage of spare parts. However, in October 2024, Gómez Roca was reported operational engaging in an exercise with her sister ships Espora, Rosales and Robinson as well as with the destroyers La Argentina, Almirante Brown, and Sarandí and with several other vessels.

== Specifications ==
- Displacement: n/a tons (empty); 1,790 tons (full load)
- Length: n/a ft (91.2 m)
- Beam: n/a ft (11.1 m)
- Draught: n/a ft (4.5 m)
- Propulsion:
  - 2 shafts / propellers
  - 2 Semt-Pielstick 16 PC2-5 V 400 diesel engines, 20,400 shp (15,200 kW) tot.
  - Max shaft horsepower: n/a shp max
- Speed: 27 knots (50 km/h)
- Range: 4,000 nautical miles (7,000 km) at 18 knots (33 km/h)
- Armament
  - 4 × Aérospatiale MM 38 Exocet SSM (As of 2020, work was underway to maintain the missile's operational relevance; missiles removed from Parker given her 2021-23 conversion to the offshore patrol role)
  - 1 × 76 mm 62-cal. OTO Melara DP compact gun
  - 2 × twin 40 mm 70-cal. OTO Melara (Breda Bofors) AA guns
  - 2 × 12.7 mm machine guns
  - 2 × triple 324 mm ILAS-3 ASW torpedo tubes (Whitehead AS-244 torpedoes, quantity n/a)
- Aircraft: aft helicopter deck (and telescopic hangar in the second batch vessels); 1 SA-319B Alouette III or 1 AS-555-SN Fennec helicopter
- Complement:100
- Radar:
  - Air/Surface Search & helicopter control: Signaal DA05 (equipped with IFF).
  - Fire Control: Signaal WM2
  - Navigation: Decca TM 1226
- Sonar: Atlas Elektronik ASO 4 (hull)
- Electronic Warfare
  - Decoys: (no details available)
- Datalink: Signaal Sewaco
- Weapons Control System: Signaal WM22/41, Lirod director (radar/optronic)
- Concept/Program: German designed, Argentine built general purpose frigates (classified as "corvettes" by the Argentine navy).
- Builder: AFNE "Rio Santiago" shipyard, La Plata, Argentina.
- Designer: Blohm + Voss, Hamburg, Germany.
- Design: MEKO 140 modular design.

== Ships in the class ==
First Batch:

- ARA Espora
- ARA Rosales
- ARA Spiro

Second Batch:

- ARA Parker
- ARA Robinson
- ARA Gómez Roca
