= MEKO 140 =

1985 class of German-designed corvettes

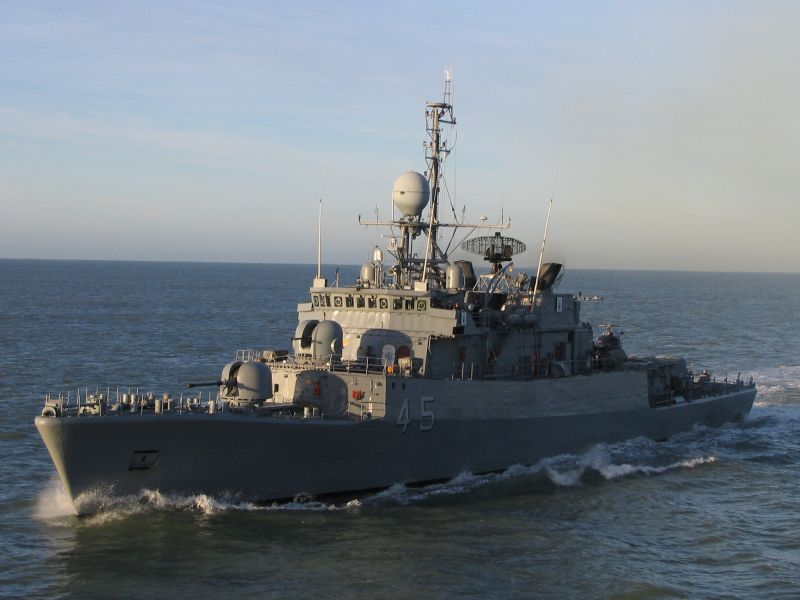
- ARA Robinson

Class overview
- Builders: AFNE "Río Santiago"
- Operators: Argentine Navy
- Subclasses: Espora class
- In commission: 1985–present
- Completed: 6
- Active: 6

General characteristics
- Type: Frigate/corvette
- Displacement: 1,790 tons
- Length: 91.2 m (299 ft 3 in)
- Beam: 11.1 m (36 ft 5 in)
- Draught: 4.5 m (14 ft 9 in)
- Propulsion: 2 Diesel engines; 15,210 kW (20,400 shp); 2 shafts/propellers
- Speed: 27 knots (50 km/h; 31 mph)
- Range: 4,000 nmi (7,400 km; 4,600 mi) at 18 knots (33 km/h; 21 mph)
- Complement: 100
- Armament: 4 × Exocet anti-ship missiles; 1 × 76 mm dual-purpose gun; 4 × 40 mm anti-aircraft guns; 2 × .50 cal machine guns; 6 × 324 mm torpedo tubes
- Aircraft carried: 1 helicopter

The MEKO 140 is a frigate/corvette design by the German Blohm + Voss shipyard as part of the MEKO family of vessels. The MEKO 140 is a development of the Portuguese Navy's João Coutinho-class corvettes designed by the Portuguese naval engineer Rogério de Oliveira in the late 1960s – three ships of which were built Blohm + Voss in 1970, as an outsourcing.

== Concept and development ==
MEKO is a concept in modern naval shipbuilding based on modularity of armament, electronics, and other equipment, aiming at ease of maintenance and cost reduction. Vessels of similar classes can use different weapons systems, as required by the customer. The MEKO 140 was designed in the late 1970s, and was chosen by the Argentine Navy to complement the MEKO 360 destroyers.

== Variants ==
Six vessels of the MEKO 140 A16 variant were constructed in Argentina by the Río Santiago Shipyards (AFNE) near La Plata for the Argentine Navy. They are locally named as the Espora class and currently serve in the High Seas Fleet ("Flota de Mar").

Although considered by its designers to be frigates, the Espora-class vessels have been classed in Argentina as corvettes.
