= Falklands War order of battle: Argentine naval forces =

This article describes the composition and actions of the Argentine naval forces in the Falklands War. For a list of naval forces from the United Kingdom, see Falklands War order of battle: British naval forces.

== Background ==
The Argentine Navy (ARA), particularly its commander-in-chief and Junta member, Admiral Jorge Anaya, was the main architect and supporter of a military solution to resolve the long-standing claim of sovereignty over the islands. By 1982 the country was already in the midst of a devastating economic crisis and large-scale civil unrest against the repressive government and Anaya, now a member of the ruling Junta, ordered Operation Rosario to be brought forward to 2 April, after a group of Argentina military infiltrated a group of Argentine scrap metal merchants and raised the Argentine flag at South Georgia 19 March.

General Galtieri, acting president, agreed in his intention to mount a quick, symbolic occupation, followed rapidly by a withdrawal, leaving only a small garrison to support the new military governor and force the UK to begin talks on the long-delayed sovereignty claim. On 2 April an amphibious landing was made at Stanley and on 3 April Argentine marines used helicopters to take over the Georgias. Whilst the military junta was redeploying the assault units back to their home bases they found the British responded with a large-scale mobilisation to organise a naval task force and ground forces to retake the islands by force.

The war could not have happened at a worse time for the Argentines. They were expecting new destroyers, frigates and submarines being built in West Germany and their shipment of French Super Étendards and Exocets were not yet complete.

== Argentine Navy ==
=== Operation Rosario (2 April) ===
Vice Admiral Juan José Lombardo

==== Task Group 20 ====
Commander José Sarcona (covering force)
- ARA Veinticinco de Mayo – a Colossus-class aircraft carrier
- ARA Comodoro Py – a Gearing-class destroyer
- ARA Comodoro Seguí – an Allen M. Sumner-class destroyer
- ARA Hipólito Bouchard – an Allen M. Sumner-class destroyer
- ARA Piedrabuena – an Allen M. Sumner-class destroyer
- ARA Punta Médanos – fleet tanker

==== Task Group 40 ====
Rear Admiral Jorge Allara (amphibious force)

- ARA Santísima Trinidad – Argentine-built Type 42 destroyer (flagship)
- ARA Cabo San Antonio – Argentine-built De Soto County-class LST, an amphibious landing ship
- ARA Hércules – Type 42 destroyer
- ARA Granville – a Drummond-class corvette
- ARA Drummond – a Drummond-class corvette
- ARA Almirante Irízar – icebreaker
- ARA Santa Fe – A Balao-class, GUPPY program submarine
- ARA Isla de los Estados – supply ship

=== South Georgia (3 April) ===
- ARA Guerrico – a Drummond-class corvette (†1)
- ARA Bahia Paraiso – Antarctic survey ship. A polar transport, later deployed as hospital ship off Stanley. Bahía Paraíso transported Argentine forces from Corbeta Uruguay base to South Georgia in the events preceding the Falklands War.

=== Falklands Theatre of Operations [Teatro de Operaciones Malvinas] (2 April–14 June) ===
- ARA Alferez Sobral – a Sotoyomo-class patrol vessel heavily damaged on 3 May by Sea Skua missiles fired by Westland Lynx HAS.Mk.2/3 helicopters from HMS Glasgow and HMS Coventry. She managed to reach Puerto Deseado on 5 May. (†8)
- ARA Comodoro Somellera, a Sotoyomo-class patrol vessel. During the war the British claimed to have sunk Comodoro Somellera with a Sea Skua. This claim was subsequently dropped when the British evaluated wartime reports after the campaign. The ship continued to serve in the Argentine navy until 1998 when she sank in the port of Ushuaia during a storm following a collision with ARA Suboficial Castillo.
- ARA Isla de los Estados – transport ship sunk by HMS Alacrity in Falkland Sound. (†22)
- ARA Bahía Buen Suceso – a transport ship, Bahía Buen Suceso transported Constantino Davidoff's party to South Georgia precipitating the Falklands War. She was ordered to move from Stanley to the Falklands Sound on 29 April. During the journey back, on 7 May, the ship spotted the ketch Penelope, property of the FIC, which was taken over by an Argentine prize crew the following day. While at anchor at Fox Bay, the transport ran aground in a storm and was later damaged by 30 mm ADEN cannon fire from BAe Sea Harrier FRS.Mk.1s. The British eventually captured the hull after the war and sank her in high seas.

=== South Atlantic Theatre of Operations [Teatro de Operaciones del Atlántico Sur] (15 April–14 June) ===
Direct control from Puerto Belgrano Naval Base, Buenos Aires Province.
Vice Admiral Juan Lombardo

==== Task Group 79.1 ====
Rear Admiral Jorge Allara

- ARA Veinticinco de Mayo – The threat of submarine attacks kept the carrier confined to port after 3 May.
- ARA Hércules – Type 42 destroyer.
- ARA Santísima Trinidad – Type 42 destroyer.
- ARA Punta Médanos – a fleet tanker.

==== Task Group 79.3 ====
Captain Héctor Bonzo

- ARA General Belgrano – a Brooklyn-class cruiser sunk by Mk.8 torpedoes fired by HMS Conqueror. (†323)
- ARA Hipólito Bouchard – destroyer
- ARA Piedrabuena – destroyer
- ARA Punta Delgada – fleet tanker

==== Task Group 79.4 ====
Captain Juan Calmon

- ARA Drummond – corvette
- ARA Guerrico – corvette
- ARA Granville – corvette

==== Submarine force ====
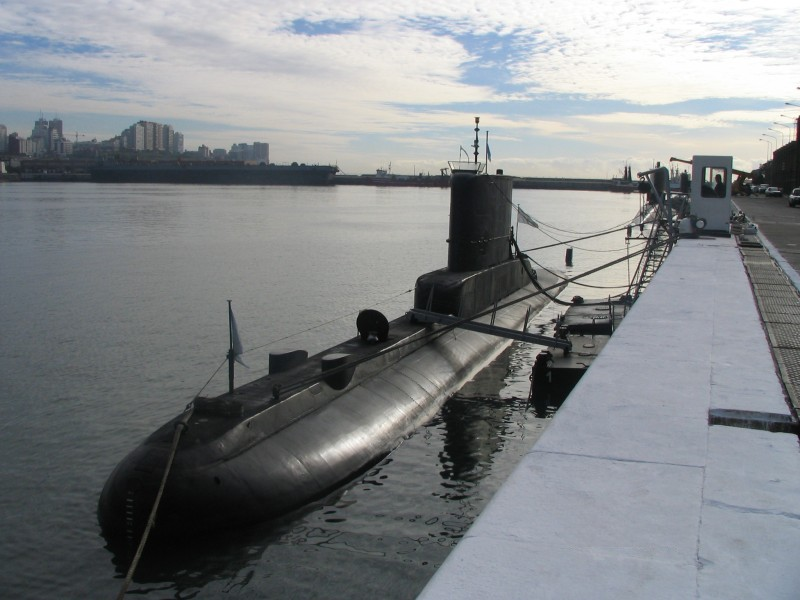
ARA San Luis sister ship, ARA Salta, here docked at her base in Mar del Plata, was not operational at the time of the war.

- ARA San Luis – A Type 209 submarine - Despite evading detection from the Royal Navy, defective torpedoes prevented the submarine from hitting any valuable target.
- ARA Santa Fe – The submarine landed a team of amphibious commandos at Yorke Bay on 2 April 1982. Santa Fe was disabled at Grytvyken by Aerospatiale AS.12 ASM (Air-to-Surface Missiles) fired from Westland Wasp HAS.Mk.1 helicopters from HMS Plymouth and HMS Endurance. Raised and scuttled by the British in 1985. (†1)

==== Others ====
- ARA Almirante Irízar – (acting as hospital ship)
- ARA Francisco de Gurruchaga – a patrol ship.

== Argentine Coast Guard ==
Stationed at the Falklands Naval Station.

- Islas Malvinas – A Z-28 type naval patrol craft, damaged with machine gun fire by a Westland Lynx HAS.Mk.2/3 helicopter from HMS Alacrity on 1 May 1982 near Kidney Island. She was captured at Stanley by the British on 14 June 1982 and renamed HMS Tiger Bay.
- Río Iguazú – A Z-28 type naval patrol craft, strafed and damaged by BAe Sea Harrier FRS.Mk.1s on 22 May in Choiseul Sound while steaming towards Goose Green with two 105 mm guns aboard, beached in Button Bay. The guns were recovered by divers from the Argentine Army and taken off by helicopter, though one was damaged, and were used in the defence of Darwin. Later captured by British Forces, but attacked by a Westland Lynx HAS.Mk.2/3 (XZ691) from HMS Penelope firing a Sea Skua on 13 June 1982. The wreck was towed to Goose Green after the conflict. (†1)

== Argentine Merchant Navy ==
=== Blockade runners ===
- Formosa – A 12,762-ton ELMA cargo ship, attacked by Argentine Douglas A-4 Skyhawks of Grupo 5 by mistake. She was hit by an unexploded 1,000 lb bomb and strafed while bound for Rio Gallegos. Survived the conflict.
- Río Carcarañá – An ELMA cargo ship, 8,500 tons, damaged by Sea Harriers in Port King. Subsequently attacked by both sides, until finally sunk by Sea Skua missiles fired from a Westland Lynx helicopter on 23 May 1982.
- Río de la Plata II – An ELMA cargo vessel of 10,409 tons. Spotted by British off Ascension Island and warned off on 24 April 1982. The most successful Argentine spy ship; she collected valuable intelligence about the type of warships, logistic craft and merchantmen deployed by the British to the south.
- Yehuín – A requisitioned oil tender, 494 tons, from the Geomater company. Captured 15 June 1982 and renamed Falkland Sound. Sold to a British owner from London in 1991, then transferred to several Panamanian companies. Returned to Argentine control as Audax II when bought by Cintra company in 2008, and under Uruguayan registry since 2011
- Río Cincel – An ELMA cargo ship. Unloaded supplies in Port Stanley from 7 to 9 April. Survived the conflict.
- Mar del Norte – A cargo ship from La Naviera company. Survived the conflict.
- Lago Argentino – An ELMA cargo ship. Survived the conflict.
- Puerto Rosales – A commercial tanker from YPF. Survived the conflict.

=== Trawlers ===
- Narwal – Owned by Compañía Sudamericana de Pesca y Exportación from Bahía Blanca. Based at Ingeniero White. A 1,300-ton stern fishing freezer trawler. On patrol northwest of the exclusion zone since 26 April. Under the command of Lt. Cdr. Juan Carlos González Llanos. The civilian skipper was Captain Nestor Leonardo Fabiano. She made a number of visual contacts with British aircraft and warships, including a submarine, according to the Argentine version. Damaged on 9 May 1982 by an unexploded 1,000 lb. bomb and 30 mm ADEN cannon fire from two BAe Sea Harrier FRS.Mk.1s of 800 Naval Air Squadron, HMS Hermes. A member of the crew, sailor Omar Alberto Rupp, was killed. She was later captured by Royal Marines. Narwal eventually sank in a storm at 52°45′S 58°02′W on 10 May 1982. (†1)
- María Alejandra – Owned by Inda hnos. from Mar del Plata. On patrol northwest of the exclusion zone from 26 April to 4 May. She piloted the disabled ARA Alférez Sobral into Puerto Deseado. Maria Alejandra also acted as a radio link between the ill-fated Narwal and the mainland.
- Constanza – Owned by Arpemar from Mar del Plata. On patrol northwest of the exclusion zone from 26 April to 4 May.
- Invierno – Owned by Arpemar from Mar del Plata. On patrol northwest of the exclusion zone from 5 to 9 May.
- Capitán Canepa – Based at Mar del Plata. From the government fishery agency SEIM.
- María Luisa – Based at Mar del Plata. Spotted a British warship on 26 April, shortly after being overflown by a fighter jet. This revealed to the Argentine intelligence the path of the British battle group. Part of a three-trawler flotilla that intercepted supply vessel RFA Fort Grange on 29 April at the position 34°28′S 31°26′W. On 30 April she returned to Mar del Plata due to mechanical problems.
- Usurbil – Based at Ingeniero White. Under the command of Lt. Cdr. Fernando Pedro Amorena. The civilian skipper was Captain Adolfo Antonio Arbelo from Mar del Plata. Fifty per cent of her crew was Spanish. Part of a three-trawler flotilla that intercepted supply vessel RFA Fort Grange on 29 April at the position 34°28′S 31°26′W. She made radar contact with six ships sailing in convoy on 8 May. Warned off by a warship and a helicopter, she returned to Buenos Aires.
- Mar Azul – Based at Mar del Plata. Part of a three-trawler flotilla that intercepted supply vessel RFA Fort Grange on 29 April at the position 34°28′S 31°26′W. She tracked the 8 May convoy by radar along with Usurbil, but was ordered to return to Mar del Plata on 9 May before making visual contact.

==== Operation Relámpago ====
Operation Relámpago (Thunderbolt) was a planned resupply mission to be carried out by the Argentine Navy between May and June using four requisitioned trawlers crewed with naval personnel. Some of the ships had been previously involved in surveillance and rescue operations, but crewed by their civilian complements. The trawlers were moored with their cargoes in different inlets at Isla de los Estados, awaiting for an opportunity to cross to the Falklands, but the Argentine Navy dropped the plans just before the final British assault on Port Stanley.

- María Alejandra (ut supra)
- Margot – Owned by Esdipa s.a. from Mar del Plata.
- María Eugenia
- Capitán Cánepa (ut supra)

== Vessels seized by the Argentine Navy ==
=== Falkland Islands ships seized by the Argentine Navy ===
==== Falkland Islands Government ship ====
- ARA Forrest – armed coaster: She fought off a Sea Lynx helicopter that had put the patrol craft Islas Malvinas out of action near Kidney Island on 1 May. The aircraft came back to HMS Alacrity with serious damage from small arms fire, while Forrest was repeatedly struck by machine gun fire, without casualties. While at anchor in Port Howard in the night of 10 May, the ship received a stress signal from ARA Isla de los Estados when the transport was shelled and sunk by Alacrity. Forrest sailed off, but was ordered to steam back to port after being illuminated by two star shells. The following day she rescued two survivors of the crew of the lost ship. Later in the war, Forrest towed ARA Monsunen to Darwin, after this ship faced the attack of two British frigates and a helicopter. She uploaded ARA Monsunen's cargo and completed the supply mission to Stanley on 25 May. The vessel was involved in harbour duties until the end of the war.

==== Falklands Islands Company ships ====
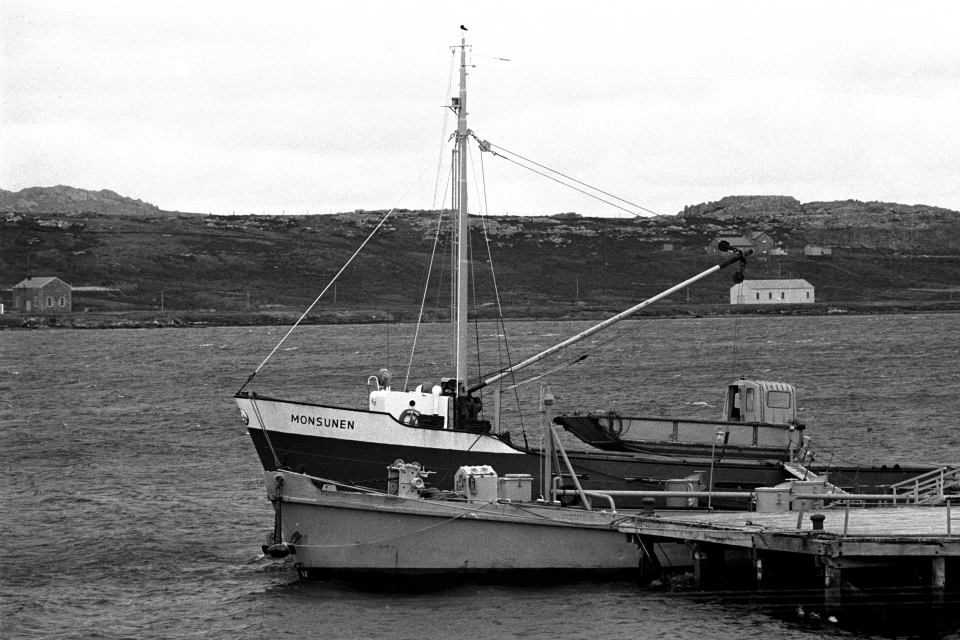
Coaster Monsunen (detail)

- ARA Monsunen – armed coaster: She survived the attack of two British frigates and a helicopter west of Lively island, successfully avoiding them by running aground at Seal Cove, while defending herself with machine gun fire. Her supply mission was eventually carried out by ARA Forrest, which towed her to Darwin. Recovered by British forces on 29 May, after the battle of Goose Green.
- ARA Penelope – ketch: Spotted by ARA Bahía Buen Suceso at Speedwell Island and seized by an Argentine prize crew on 7 May. She accomplished a logistic mission from Fox Bay to Stanley. While uploading her cargo, the ketch endured a naval bombardment by HMS Plymouth on Fox Bay's fuel depots during the first hours of 26 May. Penelope eventually reached Stanley with a cargo of fuel drums on 2 June.

=== Minor vessels at Stanley harbour ===
- James Caird – a captured whaleboat belonging to HMS Endurance, left behind at port pending repairs, which were completed by Argentine technicians. The motor boat was prepared for a mission of sabotage with limpet mines in the Falklands Sound the first week of May, but it was aborted when the vessel had made barely 9.5 miles (15.3 km) from Port Stanley. Aside from harbour duties, the whaler also laid a telephone cable connecting the port and Cortley Ridge on 4 June.
- Lively – a captured docking tug
- F-852 – a captured fuel barge
- Lancha n° 9 – an LCVP originally part of the Argentine landing force, used for harbour duties and captured by the British after the Argentine capitulation.
- Lancha n° 23 – an LCVP originally part of the Argentine landing force, used for harbour duties and captured by the British after the Argentine capitulation.

== See also ==
- Argentine air forces in the Falklands War
- Argentine ground forces in the Falklands War
- List of ships of the Argentine Navy
