= Falklands Naval Station =

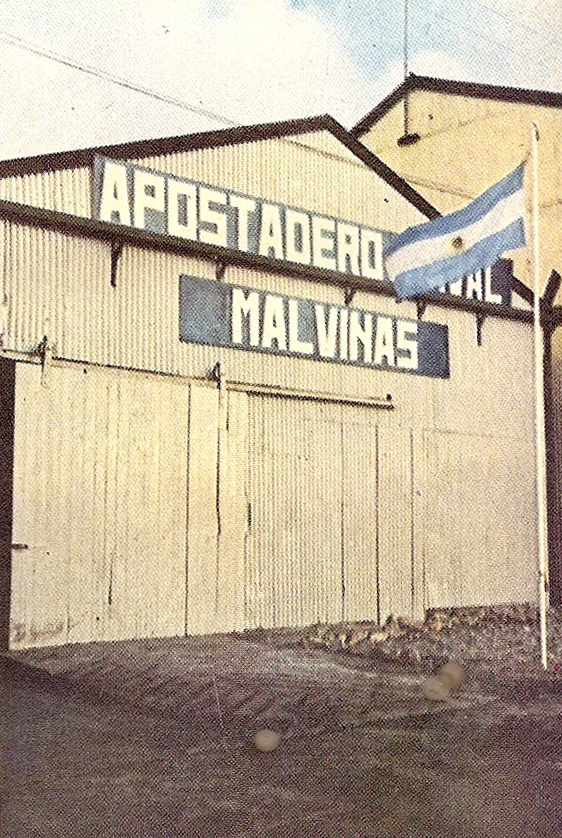
Apostadero Naval Malvinas (1982)

The Falklands Naval Station (Spanish: Apostadero Naval Malvinas) was the main base of the naval component of Argentina in the Falklands Islands (or Malvinas Islands), during the Falklands War.

== History ==
The Falklands Naval Station was a naval port facility of the Argentine Navy, established on April 2, 1982, by the Sea Fleet Command; having been located in the town of Port Stanley, the main port and population center of the Falklands Islands. The unit was established in the buildings near the East Pier of Port Stanley, although part of the staff was also commissioned to other places in the capital and the rest of the archipelago. The first and only commanding officer was frigate captain Adolfo Aurelio Gaffoglio and the unit was dissolved de facto with the end of the 1982 conflict.

Initially, its purpose was to provide logistical support to the naval units operating in the Falklands but as the Falklands War developed, its activities extended to undertake missions of all kinds. Argentina had not been involved in a war since the Paraguayan War in the late 19th Century and as a result, the force marked a number of milestones in the history of Argentina's Naval Force, including the anchoring of naval mines off Port Stanley and the launch of Exocet MM-38 missiles in a coastal defence role using an improvised launcher.

Sailors from the command were tasked with manning the small coastal craft seized from the Falkland Islands Government and Falkland Islands Company. On 1 May 1982, Islas Malvinas GC82, an Argentine Z-28 type naval patrol boat was damaged near the Kidney Island by a Westland Lynx HAS.Mk.2/3 helicopter from HMS Alacrity, the British helicopter (XZ720) was in turn damaged by gunfire from the armed coaster ARA Forrest. During a mission carried out by Monsunen to resupply the garrison at Port Stanley from Fox Bay, the small Argentine vessel was engaged by British naval and air forces during the Battle of Seal Cove. Although compelled to temporarily abandon the ship when it ran aground, it refloated on the incoming tide and with assistance from the ARA Forrest they were able to complete the resupply trip. On 13 June seamen from the unit were deployed as infantry supporting the Argentine marines and engaged the SBS and SAS during a diversionary raid on the northern bank of Port Stanley Harbour.

== Ships ==
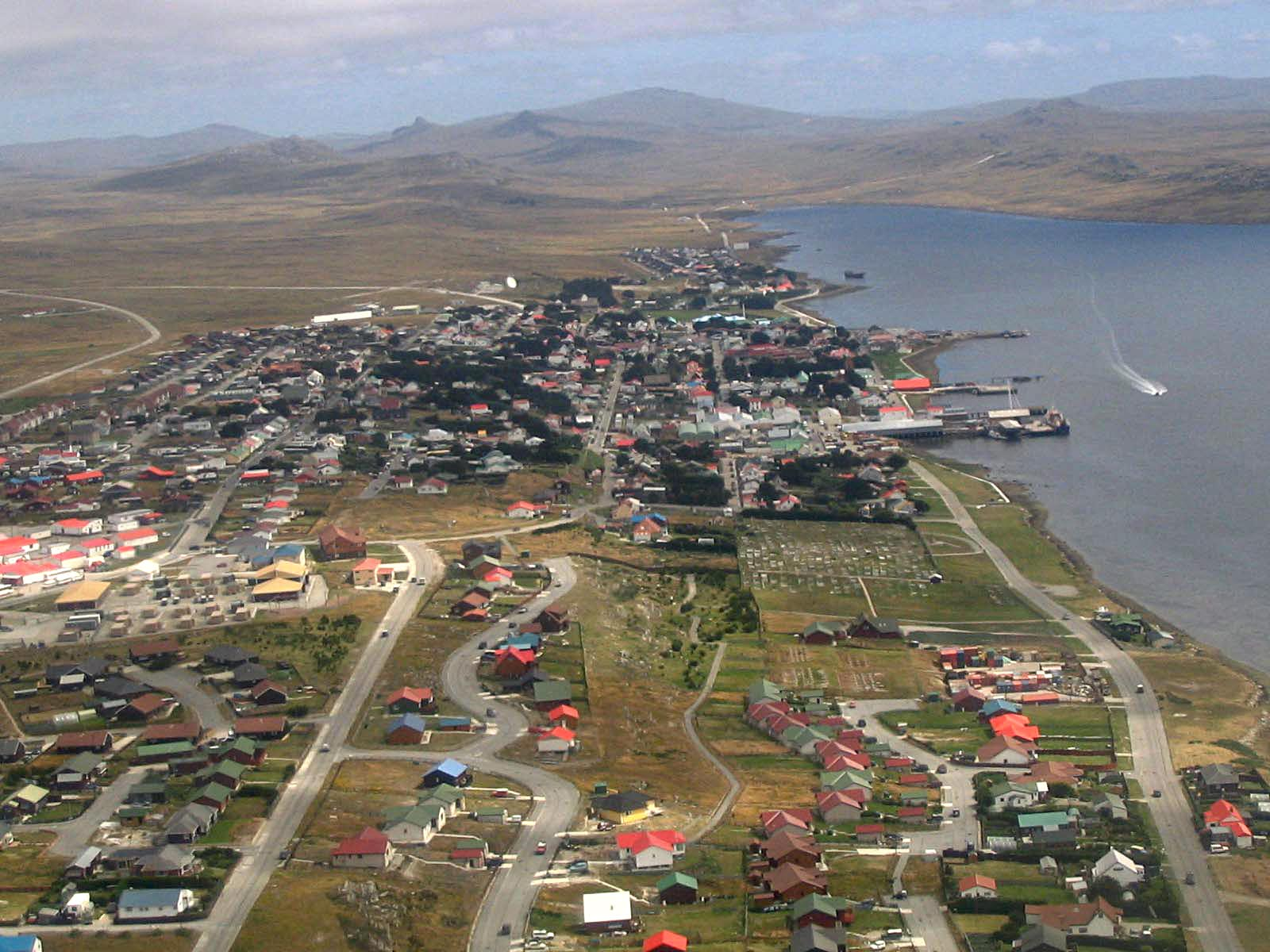
Port Stanley (2005)

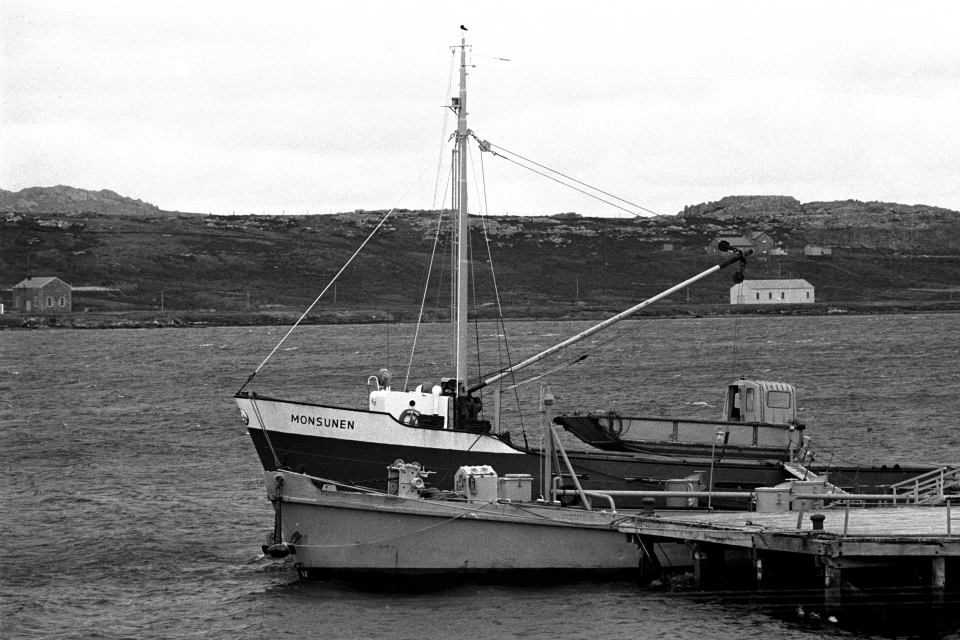
Monsunen

The ships stationed at this base included:

- ARA Bahía Buen Suceso
- ARA Isla de los Estados
- ELMA Formosa
- ELMA Río Carcarañá
- Yehuín
- ARA Forrest
- ARA Monsunen
- ARA Penelope
- PNA Islas Malvinas
- PNA Río Iguazú

In addition, there was a small unit known as the "Boat Group" (Spanish: Dotación de Lanchas), which crewed the tugboat Lively, two EDPV-type landing craft and a barge used for refuelling.

== See also ==
- Empresa Líneas Marítimas Argentinas (ELMA)
- Falklands War order of battle: Argentine naval forces
