= List of auxiliary ships of the Argentine Navy =

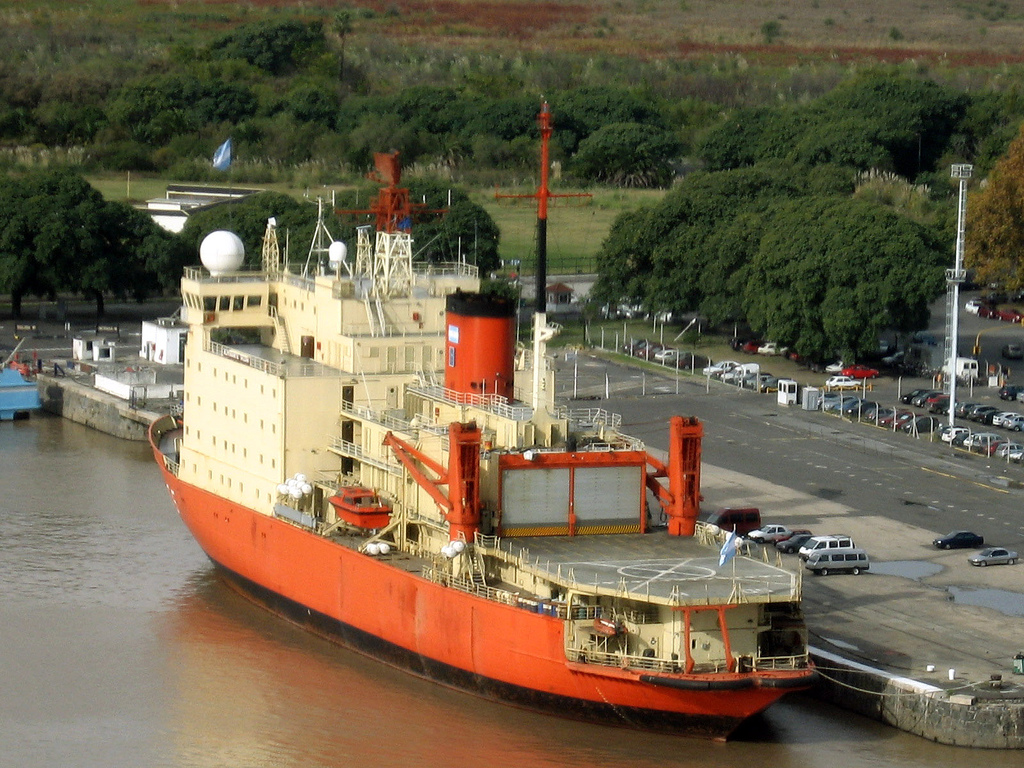
ARA Almirante Irizar icebreaker

This list includes all major auxiliary ships (transports, colliers, tankers, scientific vessels, tugs, among others) in service with the Argentine Navy since being formally established in the 1860s. (Note: In 1861 the modern Argentine Republic was born, after the Battle of Pavón.) It does not include vessels prior to that date, nor does it include warships which are listed separately.

The list is organized by type of ship, by class within each type, and by service entry date within each class. Service entry dates indicate the ship's commissioning into the Argentine Navy, and not the ship's entry in service with another navy unless specifically said.

There is a separate list of current ships of the Argentine Navy regardless the type.

== Naming tradition ==
The current norms establish naming conventions for Argentine Navy ships according to their type; some of these used for auxiliaries are summarized below.

Avisos, salvage ships, maritime tugs
Mariners or civilians of relevance to the Navy.
Icebreakers and polar ships
Antarctic coastal geographic features, or names historically related with the Argentine activity in Antarctica.
Transports and tankers
Coastal geographic features.
Research ships
Maritime port cities.

== List of ships ==
=== Avisos ===
Irigoyen class (US-built)

Ship Name	Pennant Number	Other names	Service entry	Decommissioning
ARA Comandante Gral. Irigoyen	A-1	USS Cahuilla	1961	2010
ARA Francisco de Gurruchaga	A-3	USS Luiseno	1975	in service
ARA Suboficial Castillo	A-6	USS Takelma	1993	in service

Zapiola class (US-built)

Ship Name	Pennant Number	Other names	Service entry	Decommissioning
ARA Comandante Gral. Zapiola	A-2	USS Arapaho	1961	1976

Sotyomo class (US-built)

Ship Name	Pennant Number	Other names	Service entry	Decommissioning
ARA Diaguita	A-5	ex-US Navy (ATA-124)	1947	1979
ARA Yamana	A-6	ex-US Navy (ATA-126)	1947/8	1985
ARA Chiriguano	A-7	ex-US Navy (ATA-227)	1947	1996
ARA Sanaviron	A-8	ex-US Navy (ATA-228)	1947	1997
ARA Alférez Sobral	A-9	USS Salish (ATA-187)	1972	2019
ARA Comodoro Somellera	A-10	USS Catawba (ATA-210)	1972	1998

Teniente Olivieri class aviso (US-built)

Ship Name	Pennant Number	Other names	Service entry	Decommissioning
ARA Teniente Olivieri	A-2	Marsea 10 (in the US Maritime Administration)	1987	in service

Neftegaz class (Polish-built)

Ship Name	Pennant Number	Other names	Service entry	Decommissioning
ARA Puerto Argentino	A-21	Neftegaz 61	2015	in service
ARA Estrecho San Carlos	A-22	Neftegaz 51	2015	in service
ARA Bahía Agradable	A-23	Neftegaz 71; Tumcha	2015	in service
ARA Islas Malvinas	A-24	Neftegaz 57	2015	in service

=== Icebreakers ===
General San Martín class icebreaker (German-built)

Ship Name	Pennant Number	Other names	Service entry	Decommissioning
ARA General San Martín	Q-4	none	1954	1982

Almirante Irizar class icebreaker (Finnish-built)

Ship Name	Pennant Number	Other names	Service entry	Decommissioning
ARA Almirante Irizar	Q-5	none	1978	In service (Note: Currently unserviceable, awaiting repairs due a 2007 incident.)

=== Multipurpose ships ===
Ciudad de Zárate class multipurpose ship (US-built)

Ship Name	Pennant Number	Other names	Service entry	Decommissioning
ARA Ciudad de Zárate	Q-61	USCG Red Cedar (WLM 688)	2000	in service
ARA Ciudad de Rosario	Q-62	USCG Red Wood (WLM 685)	2000	in service
ARA Punta Alta	Q-63	USCG Red Birch (WLM 687)	2000	in service

=== Oceanographic/Hydrographic Research ===
Capitán Cánepa-class (ex Flower-class, Canadian-built)

Ship Name	Pennant Number	Other names	Service entry	Decommissioning
ARA Capitán Cánepa	Q-3	HMCS Barrie; Gasestado	1957	1972

Comodoro Lasserre-class (ex Colony-class, US-built)

Ship Name	Pennant Number	Other names	Service entry	Decommissioning
ARA Comodoro Lasserre	Q-9	HMS Caicos; ARA Santísima Trinidad	1963	1969

Islas Orcadas-class (ex Eltanin-class, US-built)

Ship Name	Pennant Number	Other names	Service entry	Decommissioning
ARA Islas Orcadas		USNS Eltanin (T-AGOR-8)	1974	1979

Puerto Deseado-class oceanographic ship (Argentine-built)

Ship Name	Pennant Number	Other names	Service entry	Decommissioning
ARA Puerto Deseado	Q-20	none	1979	in service

Hydrographic ships (Argentine-built)

Ship Name	Pennant Number	Other names	Service entry	Decommissioning
ARA Comodoro Rivadavia	Q-11	none	1974	in service
ARA Cormorán	Q-15	none	1964	in service
ARA Petrel	Q-16	none	1965	2014

=== Repair ships ===
Achelous class (US-built)

Ship Name	Pennant Number	Other names	Service entry	Decommissioning
ARA Ingeniero Iribas	Q-21	USS ARL-5	1947	1967
ARA Ingeniero Gadda	Q-22	USS ARL-6	1947	1960

=== Tankers/Oilers ===
Motor ships (various origins) (Note: These ships can't be included in a specific "class", so are listed together in this table.)

Ship Name	Pennant Number	Other names	Service entry	Decommissioning
ARA Ingeniero Julio Krause	B-13	ex-YPF	1993	Sunk as target in 2016

Steam ships (various origins) (Note: These older ships can't be included in a specific "class", so are listed together in this table.)

Ship Name	Pennant Number	Other names	Service entry	Decommissioning
ARA Santa Cruz			1921	1921 (Note: Santa Cruz was transferred from the Navy to the YPF fleet, where it served until stuck in 1948, and scrapped.)

Patagonia-class replenishment oiler (French-built)

Ship Name	Pennant Number	Other names	Service entry	Decommissioning
ARA Patagonia	B-1	Durance (A629), French Navy, Durance-class tanker	1999	in service

Punta Cigueña-class tanker (US-built) (Note: These ships were of the T1-M-A1 type from WW2 era.)

Ship Name	Pennant Number	Other names	Service entry	Decommissioning
ARA Punta Cigueña		Sulphur Bluff	1947	1961
ARA Punta Rasa		Salt Creek	1947	1968

Punta Delgada-class tanker (ex-Klickitat-class gasoline tankers, US-built) (Note: These ships were of the T1-M-BT1 type from WW2 era.)

Ship Name	Pennant Number	Other names	Service entry	Decommissioning
ARA Punta Delgada	B-16	USS Nanticoke (AOG-66)	1948	1984
ARA Punta Loyola		USS Klickitat (AOG-64)	1948	1966
ARA Punta Ninfas		USS Michigamme (AOG-65)	1948	1963

Punta Medanos-class tanker (Argentine-built)

Ship Name	Pennant Number	Other names	Service entry	Decommissioning
ARA Punta Médanos	B-18	none	1950	1988

=== Training ships ===
Libertad class tall ship (Argentine-built)

Ship Name	Pennant Number	Other names	Service entry	Decommissioning
ARA Libertad	Q-2	none	1963	in service

Fishing training ship (Japanese-built)

Ship Name	Pennant Number	Other names	Service entry	Decommissioning
ARA Luisito	Q-51	none	1985	in service

=== Transports and cargo ships ===
Motor ships (various origins) (Note: These ships can't be included in a specific "class", so are listed together in this table.)

Ship Name	Pennant Number	Other names	Service entry	Decommissioning
ARA Ushuaia	B-4	Q-10	1940	1973 (Note: Ushuaia was in 1953 redesignated as "hydrographic" with pennant Q-10. Decommissioning date in list differs from that on ship's article.)
ARA San Julián	B-7	FS 281, SVD 381	1947	1996
ARA Magallanes		Colon, Solis ex-CAP Magallanes	1956	1963
ARA Beagle		Serena	1957	1963
ARA Isla de los Estados	B-8	Transbetica; Trans-Betica	1980	1982
ARA Capitán Panigadi		ex-YCF Ceibo; Capitán Tulio Panigadi	1988	200?
ARA Río Gallegos		Santa Cruz	1988	?
ARA San Nicolás		Hokusei Maru II ex-YCF Yaham	1988	1996
ARA Astra Federico		Ciudad de San Fernando; Astrafederico	1992	2005 (Note: Bulk carrier transferred from Astra to the Navy, inactive since then.)
ARA Astra Valentina		Ciudad de Tigre; Astravalentina	1992	2005 (Note: Bulk carrier transferred from Astra to the Navy, inactive since then.)

Steam ships (various origins) (Note: These older ships can't be included in a specific "class", so are listed together in this table.)

Ship Name	Pennant Number	Other names	Service entry	Decommissioning
ARA Azopardo			1885	1922
ARA América		Lake Hector	1923	1937
ARA Bahía Blanca			1918	1935
ARA Chubut		Punta de Indio, M.O.P. 209-C	1919	1920 (Note: Dredger leased temporarily to the Argentine Navy and converted to transport ship.)
ARA Comodoro Rivadavia		Anselm	1942	1944
ARA Constitución			1900	unknown (Note: Formerly the gunboat Constitución, converted into transport. Article in "Histarmar" does not list activity after 1923 or decommissioning date, due to lack of documentary sources.)
ARA Magallanes		Gran Chaco Argentino	1886	1887
ARA Patagonia		ex-cruiser same name	1917	1925
ARA Patagonia		Idun, Friesland	1926	1959
ARA Piedrabuena		ARA Paraná	1900	1922 (Note: Formerly the gunboat Paraná, converted into transport.)
ARA República			1900	1922 (Note: Formerly the gunboat República, converted into transport.)
ARA Río Negro		Hecla, Claris, Conde de Vilana, Pedro Tercero, Tiempo	1920	1954
ARA Vicente Fidel López		Tees	1912	1949
ARA Villarino			1880	1899

Chaco class (German-built)

Ship Name	Pennant Number	Other names	Service entry	Decommissioning
ARA Chaco		Rio Claro, Ultramar	1925	1951
ARA Pampa		Rio Bueno, Tajamar	1925	1950

Bahía Aguirre class (Canadian-built)

Ship Name	Pennant Number	Other names	Service entry	Decommissioning
ARA Bahía Aguirre	B-2	none	1950	1981
ARA Bahía Buen Suceso	B-6	none	1950	1982 (Note: Sunk as target by the Royal Navy after the Falklands War.)
ARA Bahía Thetis	B-8	none	1950	1974

Bahía Paraíso class (Argentine-built)

Ship Name	Pennant Number	Other names	Service entry	Decommissioning
ARA Bahía Paraíso	Q-6	B-1	1981	1989 (Note: She sunk in January 1989 near Palmer Station, Antarctica.)

Lapataia class (Italian-built)

Ship Name	Pennant Number	Other names	Service entry	Decommissioning
ARA Lapataia	B-10	none	1951	1971
ARA Le Maire	B-11	none	1951	1967
ARA Les Eclaireurs	B-12	none	1951	1968

Hércules class fast troop transport (British-built)

Ship Name	Pennant Number	Other names	Service entry	Decommissioning
ARA Hércules	B-52	none	1977	in service (Note: Formerly a Type 42 destroyer (D-1), was converted in 2000-2004 to this role.)

Costa Sur class (Argentine-built)

Ship Name	Pennant Number	Other names	Service entry	Decommissioning
ARA Canal Beagle	B-3	none	1978	in service
ARA Bahia San Blas	B-4	none	1978	in service (Note: Bahia San Blas was converted to amphibious cargo ship after the retirement of the ARA Cabo San Antonio, becoming the main vessel for use by the Argentine Marines.)
ARA Cabo de Hornos	B-5	none	1979	in service

Coaster supply vessels in the Falklands War

Ship Name	Pennant number	Other names	Service entry	Decommissioning
ARA Monsunen	N/A	none	1982	1982
ARA Forrest	N/A	none	1982	1982
ARA Penelope	N/A	none	1982	1982
ARA Yehuin	N/A	none	1982	1982

=== Tugs and salvage ===
Steam ships (various origins) (Note: These older ships can't be included in a specific "class", so are listed together in this table.)

Ship Name	Pennant Number	Other names	Service entry	Decommissioning
ARA Azopardo		Barstow	1922	1941

Harbour tugs (US-built)

Ship Name	Pennant Number	Other names	Service entry	Decommissioning
ARA Mocovi	R-5	ex-US Navy	1964	unknown
ARA Calchaqui	R-6	ex-US Navy (YTL 445)	1964	unknown
ARA Chulupi	R-10	ex-US Navy	1964	unknown
ARA Capayan	R-16	ex-US Navy	1965	unknown
ARA Chiquillan	R-18	ex-US Navy	1965	unknown
ARA Morcoyan	R-19	ex-US Navy	1965	unknown

== See also ==
- List of ships of the Argentine Navy
- List of active Argentine Navy ships
