= MV Monsunen =

Coaster ship built in Denmark in 1957

- Monsunen sailing under Danish flag (c. 1970)

History

Denmark
- Name: Monsunen
- Namesake: Monsoon
- Owner: C.H.C.Andersen
- Port of registry: Svendborg
- Builder: H. C. Christensens Staal
- Completed: 1957
- Maiden voyage: 1957
- Identification: IMO number: 5239876

United Kingdom
- Name: Monsunen
- Acquired: 1972
- Commissioned: 1972
- Decommissioned: 1992

Argentina
- Name: ARA Monsunen
- Commissioned: 12 April 1982
- Decommissioned: 29 May 1982
- Notes: taken over by the Argentine Navy

Chile
- Name: Navisur
- Commissioned: 1992

General characteristics
- Type: coaster
- Tonnage: 326 GRT
- Length: 109.8 ft (33.5 m) (originally)
- Beam: 21.2 ft (6.5 m)
- Depth: 9 ft (2.7 m)
- Decks: 1
- Installed power: 280 NHP
- Propulsion: 2 Alpha diesel engines
- Speed: 10 knots (19 km/h)
- Complement: (as ARA Monsunen): 14
- Sensors & processing systems: Navigational radar
- Armament: 2 × general purpose machine guns (as ARA Monsunen)

MV Monsunen was a coaster ship built in Denmark in 1957 that operated as an inter-island supply vessel in the Falklands from 1972 to 1992. The ship was commandeered by the Argentine Navy in the course of the Falklands War, when she served as an armed transport linking the different Argentine garrisons scattered around the islands. In 1992 she was sold to a Chilean shipping company, and since then Monsunen, now renamed Navarino, serves as a coaster linking the island of Navarino with the port of Valparaíso.

== Features ==
Monsunen was built as a motorship in 1957 by H. C. Christensens Staal in Marstal, Denmark, for C.H.C. Andersen of Svendborg, she originally had a gross register tonnage of 150 t and a net register tonnage of 69 t. Her dimensions were 109.8 ft (33.5 m) in length, 21.2 ft (6.5 m) in breadth, and a draft of 9 ft (2.7 m). She was powered by two Alpha oil engines, featuring a controllable pitch propeller, allowing her to achieve a speed of 10 knots (19 km/h; 12 mph). She had a single hold with two hatches and two derricks for loading and discharging, capable of lifting two tons each one. Her identification number is IMO 5239876. The ship endured an overhaul at Svendborg Skibsvaerft in 1968, and was extended to 138 ft 8 in (42.27 m), with a gross register tonnage of 224 t, a net register tonnage of 124 t and a deadweight tonnage of 326 t.

== Service with the Falkland Islands Company ==
The coaster was sold to the Falkland Islands Company (FIC) in 1972, arriving to Port Stanley on 12 October that year. Monsunen's main task was to transport baled wool produced by 30 settlements. from piers across the Falklands to Port Stanley, where they would be shipped to Britain. She also carried supplies and mail throughout the islands, but no passengers.

Monsunen and her fellow ship MV Forrest, owned by the Falklands Government, occasionally linked Port Stanley with Punta Arenas in southern Chile. In the late 1970s, the coaster took part in the partial salvage of the wreckage of St Mary, an American cargo sailing ship lost in August 1890 northwest of Whale Point, about 30 miles (48 km) southwest from Port Stanley. Monsunen missed good part of the 1975 sheep shearing season when a broken crackshaft saw her replaced by the old Antarctic survey ship John Biscoe. On 2 April 1982, after the surrender of British authorities to the Argentine military, the Argentine flag was raised over Monsunen and Forrest, although the ship was not formally requisitioned until ten days later.

== ARA Monsunen ==
Monsunen was confiscated by Argentine forces on 12 April 1982, after the refusal of the FIC representative to loan the ship to the Argentine Navy. The crew was selected from members of the complement of the transport ship ARA Bahía Buen Suceso; the commander would be Corvette Captain Jorge Gopcevich-Canevari, a prominent young naval officer. Local skipper George Betts was charged to instruct the Argentine crew on how to operate the ship.

The first mission of ARA Monsunen, on 14 April, was to transport supplies to the Argentine garrison at Darwin and sail back to Port Stanley with a flock of sheep. In the night of 27/28 April, the ship ferried personnel and equipment of the 5th Infantry Regiment from Port Stanley to Port Howard.

The first British airstrike on Port Stanley took place on 1st May, when Monsunen was on her way back from the Falklands Sound. The vessel sought shelter in an area northeast of the harbour, near Kidney Island. The ship was overflown by a Sea Harrier and later witnessed the attack of a Lynx helicopter from the frigate HMS Alacrity on the Argentinian coast guard vessel Islas Malvinas and the armed coaster ARA Forrest, another coaster confiscated to the FIC. The distance prevented Monsunen from intervening.

On 3 May, the supply vessel undertook a round trip to Port Howard, a key Argentine garrison in West Falkland. Her mission was the critical offloading of six 30 mm (1.2 in) anti-aircraft cannons, along with associated ammunition and equipment, transferred from the transport vessel ARA Isla de los Estados. The consignment was bound for the GADA 101, an anti-aircraft artillery unit positioned in Cortley Ridge, on the northern bank of Stanley Harbour. During this journey, Monsunen defenses were temporary enhanced with a 7.62 mm MAG general-purpose machine gun, mounted on the forecastle and manned by a sergeant and a conscript from the army's 4th Infantry Regiment, another battery-powered 7.62 mm machine gun taken from a Pucará aircraft, and a third MAG machine gun which was eventually handed over to the 5th Infantry Regiment at Port Howard.

From 4 to 9 May the coaster offloaded JP1 fuel drums from the large cargo ship Río Carcaraña, which would be sunk in successive airstrikes between 16 and 22 May at Port King, on the eastern bank of the Falklands Sound.

On 7 May, while heading north to Fox Bay through Eagle passage, Monsunen was ordered to search for a small civilian vessel spotted earlier by Bahía Buen Suceso at anchor at Speedwell Island. The report was confirmed by Monsunen, and the sailboat, the 16.2 m (53 ft 2 in) long Penelope, was seized by naval commandos flown in by helicopter a few hours later. From Fox Bay, the coaster continued to Port Howard, where she resumed the transfer of oil drums from Río Carcaraña to Port Stanley. On 13 May, another offloading mission was completed alongside Bahia Buen Suceso in Fox Bay, consisting of 100 fuel drums and 1,000 artillery rounds of 105 mm. The payload would be delivered by Monsunen to the Argentine garrison in Darwin on the 19th not before having outmaneuvered two British frigates in the Choiseul Sound on May 17th. On the 21st, Monsunen was once again in Fox Bay, where it uploaded a cargo of 150 fuel drums from an improvised depot to be shipped to Port Stanley.

On the earlier hours of May 23 the British frigates HMS Brilliant and HMS Yarmouth attempted to intercept and capture the Argentine supply ship west of Lively Island. A Lynx helicopter carrying Special Boat Service (SBS) troops was forced to retreat after encountering heavy fire from Monsunen. Subsequently, Yarmouth opened fire on the coaster. To evade the British warships, Monsunen's commander ran the vessel aground in Seal Cove, using the surrounding cliffs to obscure her from British radar. After an inaccurate shelling, the British eventually gave up their pursuit. Monsunen later refloated with the tide but was disabled by a sling entangled with her propeller. ARA Forrest came to the rescue, and towed Monsunen to Darwin, then completed the cargo's delivery to Port Stanley. The crew, along with the ship's machine gun, joined the local garrison. The second in command, Ship-of-the-line Lieutenant Oscar Vázquez, assisted the army's 105 mm guns as an artillery spotter against naval and ground targets. Monsunen was subsequently captured by British forces after the Battle of Goose Green on 29 May.

All said, the ship undertook 16 missions under Argentine flag, primarily consisting of round trips between the Falklands Sound and Port Stanley.

=== Back to British control ===
Monsunen was taken back by British forces when the Argentine garrison at Goose Green surrendered on 29 May. With the assistance of local diver Janet McLeod, Monsunen's propeller was repaired on 5 June, and the vessel was assigned to transport troops. She was manned by a crew of islanders, while the skipper was Lieutenant Commander Ian McLaren. On 7 June, she ferried D company of the 1st battalion, 7th Duke of Edinburgh's Own Gurkha Rifles and some personnel of the 2nd Battalion. Parachute Regiment from Darwin to Fitz Roy. On 8 June, Monsunen rescued survivors and attempted to take in tow LCU-F4, a landing craft from HMS Fearless which had been bombed by Argentine A-4 Skyhawk aircraft, but once again a chain tangled around her propeller and had to sail back to Goose Green, assisted by no other than the frigate Yarmouth, which was sailing back after a nightly bombardment of Argentine positions. The landing barge vanished without trace, along with the bodies of five from her crew.

== MV Navarino ==
Monsunen was the last ship owned by the FIC when she was sold to the Chilean shipping company Navisur in 1992, which operated her under the name Navisur. The coaster changed her name to Navarino in 2000. On 3 July 2002 the vessel suffered a minor fire on her bridge while unloading a cargo of fuel and construction materials from Valparaíso at the pier of Juan Fernandez Island. Two crewmembers were lightly injured.

== See also ==
- Falklands Naval Station
- Falklands War order of battle: Argentine naval forces
