= Feuerland (ship) =

Two-masted ketch built in 1927

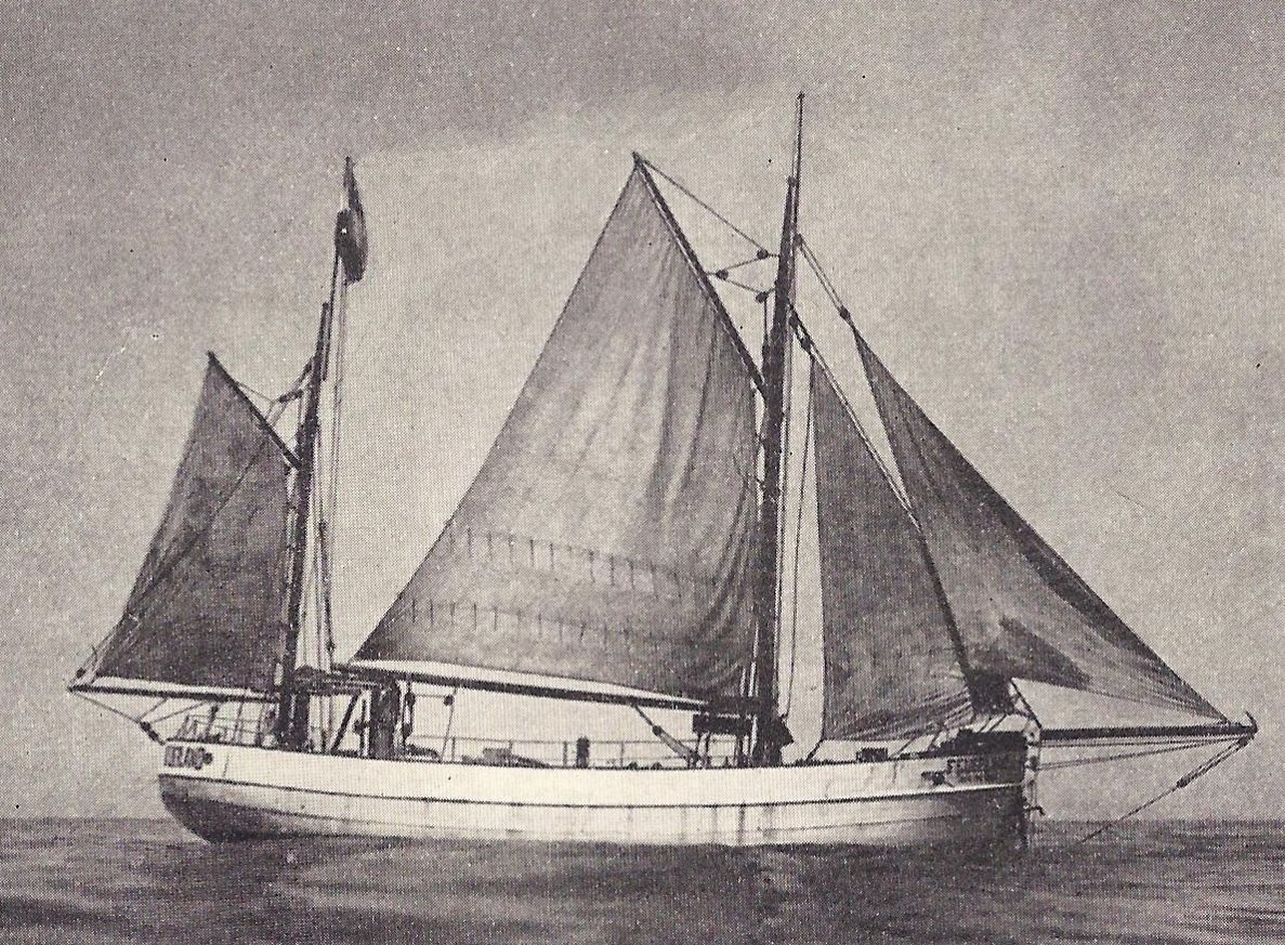
- Feuerland under full sail (c. 1927)

History

Hamburg
- Name: Feuerland
- Namesake: Tierra del Fuego
- Owner: Gunther Pluschow
- Port of registry: Hamburg
- Builder: Krämer, Vagt and Beckmann
- Completed: 1927
- Maiden voyage: 1927
- Refit: 1946

StanleyUnited Kingdom
- Name: Penelope
- Acquired: 1929
- Commissioned: 1929
- Decommissioned: 2006

StanleyArgentina
- Name: ARA Penelope
- Commissioned: 7 May 1982
- Decommissioned: 14 June 1982
- Notes: taken over by the Argentine Navy

BüsumGermany
- Name: Feuerland
- Namesake: Tierra del Fuego
- Commissioned: 2006

General characteristics
- Type: ketch
- Tonnage: 55 GRT
- Length: 16.2 m (53 ft)
- Beam: 4.88 m (16.0 ft)
- Depth: 1.9 m (6 ft 3 in)
- Decks: 1
- Installed power: 220 NHP
- Speed: 5 knots (9.3 km/h)
- Complement: (as ARA Penelope): 7

Feuerland (from 1929 to 2006 Penelope, in 1982 ARA Penelope while in Argentine service) is a two-masted ketch built in 1927 at the Krämer, Vagt and Beckmann shipyard in Büsum, Schlewig-Holstein, Germany. It was commissioned by the German naval officer and aviator Gunther Plüschow. The motor sailboat was specially built to explore Patagonia. In 1929 Feuerland was sold to a landowner in the Falkland Islands and was renamed Penelope. After more than fifty years of inter island service, the vessel was seized by the Argentine Navy and used as an auxiliary transport ship during the Falklands War. In 2006 Penelope became once again Feuerland when acquired by German skipper Bernd Buchner and shipped back to Germany, where she was declared a national monument. Feuerland is set for rebuilding as a museum ship as of 2025.

== Features ==
The sailing ship was designed as an ocean-going fishing boat. Since Plüschow was familiar with the harsh weather conditions in the South Atlantic from his previous voyages, the builders used oak wood for the frames and planking. Every part is oversized. This ensures multiple safety features, to the point that there is a tight frame spacing every 55 cm (22 in) and an 8 cm (3.1 in) thick planking at the waterline; interior lining and strong stringers provide additional sturdiness. Thanks to its strong construction, the ship successfully withstood the storms and drifting glacial ice in the fjords of Tierra del Fuego.

As built, Feuerland measured 16.2 metres (53 ft 2 in) along the deck, with a beam of 4.88 m (16 ft 0 in), a draft of 1.9 m (6 ft 3 in) and a sail area of 100 m^{2} (1,100 sq ft). The vessel's propulsion consisted of a Caterpillar 3208 8-cylinder V-engine creating 160 kilowatts (220 hp).

== Feuerland ==
In November 1927, Gunther Plüschow began his Tierra del Fuego's expedition to the southern tip of South America. His journey included stops in England, Portugal, the Canary and Cape Verde Islands before he crossed the Atlantic to Brazil. There, he visited German emigrants in port cities like Bahia and Rio de Janeiro, as well as the German emigrant colony of Blumenau. From Brazil, Plüschow traveled to Punta Arenas in the Strait of Magellan, where he acquired a Heinkel HD 24 W D-1313 seaplane, shipped there on the steamer Planet.

After assembling the aircraft, Plüschow and his co-pilot and cameraman Ernst Dreblow became the first to fly over the Darwin Range, a southern extension of the Andes, to the Argentine town of Ushuaia. This flight also carried the first airmail to the world's southernmost city. The expedition's success was largely due to the support of the Feuerland, which served as a crucial base ship for refueling, repairs, and shelter from the region's harsh weather. The unique aerial photographs taken during these flights were vital for subsequent research into this previously unknown area.

Facing a lack of funds, Plüschow was compelled to conclude his expedition in early 1929. To finance the remaining flights, aircraft storage, and his return to Germany, he sold his ship to James Hamilton, an English sheep farmer who owned lands in Argentina, Chile, and the Falkland Islands. Captain Günther Plüschow and his cameraman died in an accident 1931 during an aerial survey mission over Lago Argentino in Argentine Patagonia. His plane experienced a wing collapse during a landing approach, causing it to invert. Dreblow fell out and his parachute failed. Plüschow, also wearing a parachute, was dragged down with the plane after his parachute snagged on the tail.

== Penelope ==
Renamed Penelope, after Hamilton's youngest daughter, the ketch was operated by Plüschow's helmsman, Paul Christiansen, and engineer Seppl Schmidt for the Hamilton family until the late 1930s. During this time, she completed multiple voyages between the Chilean mainland and the Falkland Islands, with her final journey to the South American mainland occurring in June 1938. Stranded during a period due to an engine failure, Penelope was acquired and refitted by the Falkland Islands Government in 1946, and was eventually bought by the Falkland Islands Company (FIC) in 1967. George Betts, chief engineer of the ketch at the time, recalled in 2006 that the vessel seldom hoisted its sails. In those days, Penelope´s complement consisted only of three permanent crewmembers, with another hired sailor if necessary.

At the time of the 1982 Argentine invasion, Penelope, which main task was to ferry livestock through the Falklands channels and coves, was ordered to transfer children from Port Stanley boarding hostel across Falkland Sound to their homes in West Falkland. The children embarked at Port Egg, west of Goose Green, on 4 April. While sailing the Falklands Sound, the ketch was overflown by two unidentified aircraft. The sailing ship was crewed by her skipper, Finlay Ferguson, and four others.

=== ARA Penelope ===
After evacuating more children from Darwin to Port Howard, Penelope remained moored at Speedwell Island, the usual area of operations for the sheep-carrier sailboat. In that location she was spotted on 7 May by ARA Bahía Buen Suceso, which was conducting a visual and radar surveillance mission while heading to Adventure Sound from Fox Bay. After the report was confirmed by the armed coaster ARA Monsunen, Penelope was seized by a platoon of Argentine naval commandos who were flown in by helicopter some hours later. The commandos searched the ship and confiscated a box with 5,000 rounds of small-arms ammunition intended for a landowner at Lively island. An Argentine Navy's prize crew, led by Lieutenant Horacio González-Llanos, took care of the vessel the following day. Ferguson and the chief engineer were retained by the Argentine Navy for a week in order to instruct the new personnel on the ship's operation. The other three former crewmembers were airlifted to Port Stanley. Aside from the seven-man new crew's FN FAL rifles, the small vessel, now under Argentine control, was unarmed.

One Argentine crewmember, naval conscript Roberto Herrscher, who was incorporated partly due to his English proficiency, later wrote a chronicle of his days on board ARA Penelope. During that time, Penelope participated in the search for survivors of ARA Isla de los Estados, sunk by the frigate HMS Alacrity off Swan Island on 11 May. Ferguson and the engineer were landed at Egg Harbour on 13 May. The next day, while at anchor at Fox Bay, Penelope was lightly damaged in the course of the attack of a package of Harriers. On 19 May the ketch headed to Port King in order to offload cargo from the Argentine merchant ship Río Carcarañá. at anchor and disabled as a consequence of an air strike. On the night of 22 to 23 May Penelope landed Argentine Army commandos on a reconnaissance mission in Carcass Bay. On the night of 26 May, while Penelope was at anchor, awaiting to load supplies from ARA Bahía Buen Suceso, Argentine positions and the pier at Fox Bay were shelled by HMS Plymouth. The naval gunfire was directed by a Special Boat Service (SBS) team. Herrscher states that the small sailboat was violently rocked by the blasts, which shattered the cabin windows, and that he had a narrow escape when one splinter pierced a fuel tank just a few inches from where he was laying face down. On shore, an Argentine naval conscript (from ARA Bahía Buen Suceso) died from the accidental discharge of another serviceman's rifle while taking cover. The loading of supplies, consisting of 30 fuel drums, concluded by the end of May. Penelope and her cargo reached Port Stanley on 2 June, when she had been presumed lost from some time. The finding of diesel fuel in a cove allowed the small vessel to complete her trip.

During the last days of the war Penelope, along with other coasters, patrolled the approaches to Port Stanley. The vessel carried winter clothing and food from the hospital ship ARA Bahía Paraíso to the exhausted and hungry Argentine troops until 14 June, when Penelope was abandoned by her crew at dock after the Argentine capitulation. Five of Penelope's complement, all of them non-commissioned officers, managed to escape captivity by embarking on board ARA Almirante Irízar, an icebreaker converted into hospital ship which was allowed to evacuate wounded Argentine personnel. González-Llanos and Herscherr, the first as a naval officer and the second because his English skills were needed for talks between British and Argentine officials, were taken prisoners and eventually evacuated from the Falklands aboard the transport Norland.

In 1989, the FIC sold Penelope to Finlay and Bob Ferguson; seafarer and farmer Michael Clarke bought the ketch from them in 1993. The vessel was stationed at West Point Island and was employed to transport ornithologists and scientists to the western islands. These islands, distinguished by their unique avian colonies, represent one of Earth's most biodiverse animal habitats. Every three years, the Islands government commissioned Penelope for maintenance of the oil pipeline between Port Stanley and Mount Pleasant. The boat was used to transport and supply the divers in charge of the job. By 2004 Penelope was being replaced by a modern motorboat of similar capabilities, the steel-hulled Condor.

== Second time as Feuerland ==
Bernd Buchner, a German skipper, bought the ship to Clarke in April 2006. Captain Buchner attempted to sail the aging ship from Buenos Aires back to its birthplace in Büsum, Germany, with a five-member volunteer crew and a camera team. Although the oak hull had endured the rough South Atlantic weather, in a trip from the Falklands that included stopovers at Comodoro Rivadavia, Puerto Madryn and Mar del Plata, the dilapidated Oregon pine deck began to leak severely by the time they were approaching their destination. To ensure the safety of the ship and crew, they decided to transport the Feuerland as cargo on the German container ship Monte Cervantes, which successfully delivered it to Hamburg by the end of June.

The ketch, now a historical monument, was in such bad shape that it was eventually decided that she would be rebuilt in the Flensburg Museum Shipyard. The total cost of rebuilding Feuerland was estimated by 2019 in £1.5 million.

== See also ==
- Falklands Naval Station
- ARA Monsunen
- Falklands war order of battle: Argentine naval forces
- Gauss expedition

== Bibliography ==
- Mayorga, Horacio (1998) No Vencidos. Planeta. ISBN 950-742-976-X (in Spanish)
- Herrscher, Roberto (2007) Los viajes del Penélope. La historia del barco más viejo de la Guerra de Malvinas. Tusquets. ISBN 978-987-1210-58-9 (in Spanish)
