= List of ships named ARA San Martín =

At least two ships of the Argentine Navy have been named ARA San Martín or ARA General San Martín:

- ARA San Martín, was a Giuseppe Garibaldi-class cruiser launched in 1896 and scrapped in 1947.
- ARA General San Martín (Q-4), an icebreaker launched in 1954 and decommissioned in 1982.
