= Constantino Davidoff =

Argentine businessman (1942–2022)

Personal details
- Born: 1942 Avellaneda, Argentina
- Died: April 22, 2022 (aged 79–80) Avellaneda, Argentina

Constantino Sergio Davidoff (1942–2022) was an Argentine businessman and scrap metal dealer. He is remembered for the role he played in a series of events which triggered the 1982 Falklands War.

== Biography ==
Davidoff was of Bulgarian and Greek descent. Early in his career, he was involved in the salvage of decommissioned undersea telegraph cables.

In the 1970s, Davidoff negotiated with the Scottish company Christian Salvesen on a contract to dismantle their abandoned whaling stations on South Georgia. Christian Salvesen and Falkland Islands governor James R. W. Parker were initially reluctant to agree to the deal because of long-standing tensions between Argentina and Britain over the islands. The contract was finally signed in 1978 and Davidoff's company, Islas Georgia del Sur SA, was authorized to carry out salvage operations at Leith Harbour, Stromness, and Husvik.

In 1981, Davidoff travelled to South Georgia aboard the ARA Almirante Irízar to survey the salvage sites. Davidoff and his team landed at Stromness but failed to inform the British Antarctic Survey base at Grytviken of their presence before leaving several days later. After the British Embassy in Buenos Aires lodged a formal complaint about this, Davidoff personally apologized to Ambassador Anthony Williams.

By March of 1982, Davidoff had assembled a crew of around 40 metalworkers to be conveyed to South Georgia aboard the ARA Bahía Buen Suceso. Unbeknownst to Davidoff, his crew had been infiltrated by 15 APBT commandos led by Lt. Alfredo Astiz posing as civilian technicians. Davidoff did not accompany the expedition to the island, having remained at his office in Buenos Aires to coordinate transportation and supply for the workers. He later denied there had been any military personnel among his crew. When the workers arrived on the island, they raised an Argentine flag and were seen to be in possession of revolvers and bolt action hunting rifles. The ensuing diplomatic crisis culminated in the dispatch of a force of British marines followed by the invasion of the Falkland Islands by Argentina. Davidoff's employees were taken prisoner by British forces upon the surrender of Astiz's commando team.

After Argentina's defeat in the war, Davidoff was accused by newspapers including La Prensa of having secretly colluded with the Argentine military to create a pretext for an invasion of the islands. He strongly denied this and asserted that the British had precipitated the war by sending military forces to deal with a civilian matter. In 1983, Davidoff's letters to Ambassador Williams were presented to the committee that compiled the Franks Report on the events leading to the war.

In order to finance the salvage expedition, Davidoff had borrowed $2.5 million to be repaid with the profit from the recovery of the scrap metal. The failure of the expedition left him badly in debt with no recourse. He contacted Christian Salvesen again in 1983 and earnestly requested an extension of the salvage contract, but his request was denied. Davidoff was thus financially ruined and lived in poverty for the rest of his life.

Davidoff was interviewed at his home in Avellaneda by the BBC in 2010. He died in 2022.
