= Cortley Ridge raid =

1982 British raid of the Falklands War

Coordinates: 51°41′01″S 57°51′10″W

Raid on Cortley Ridge
- Part of Falkland War
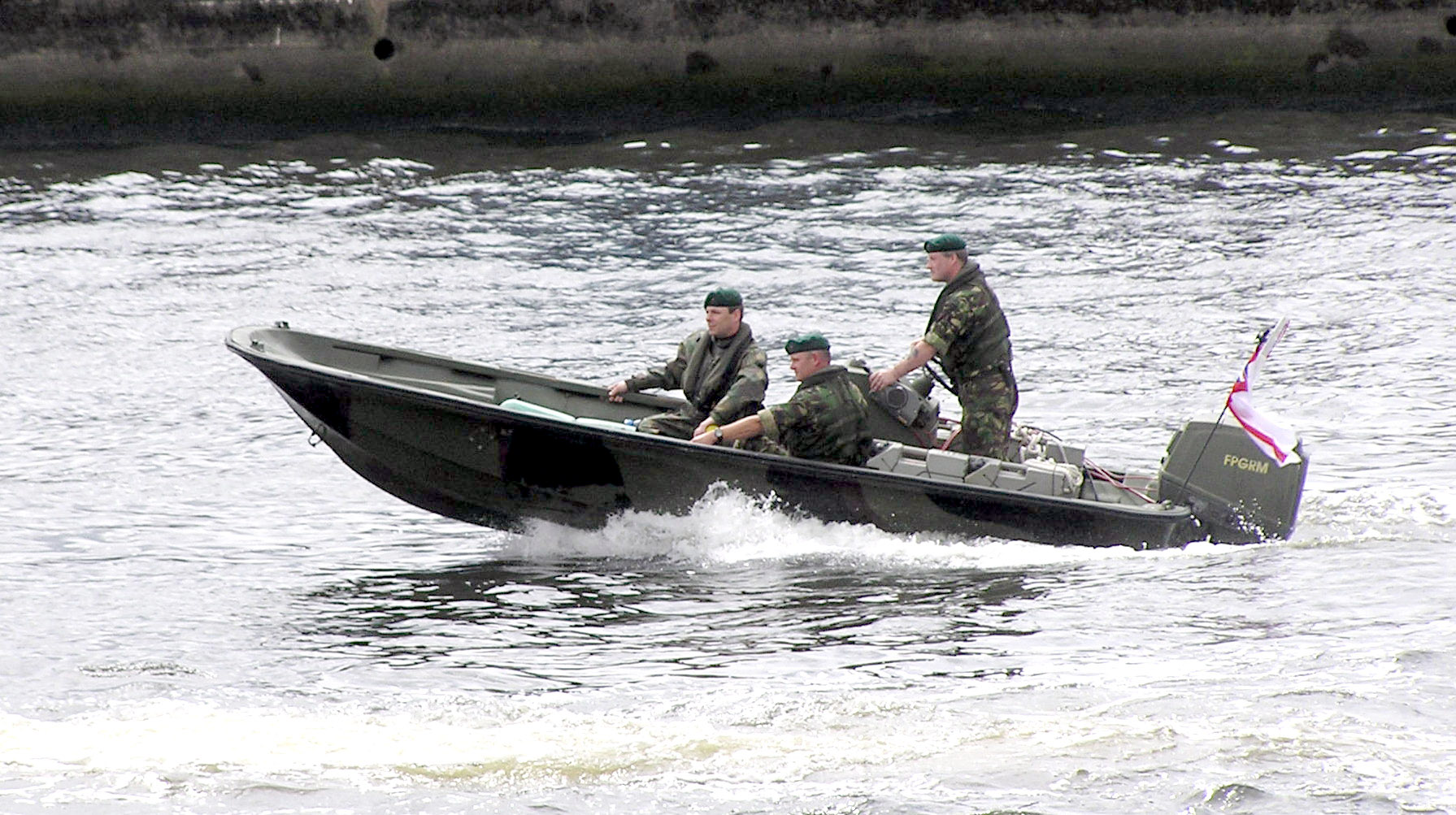
- A Royal Marines Rigid Raider (RRC) similar to those used during the raid
Date	13 - 14 June 1982
Location	Port Stanley, East Falkland
Result	Argentine victory: SAS/SBS forced to withdraw

Belligerents
United Kingdom	Argentina

Commanders and leaders
Unknown	(Argentina) Jorge Alberto Monge (Argentina) Héctor Gazzolo

Units involved
Special Air Service; Special Boat Service	Argentine Marines; Sailor riflemen; 101 AA artillery Group

Casualties and losses
4 RRCs lost 3 wounded	2 killed

The Special Air Service (SAS), along with men from the Special Boat Squadron (SBS), attempted to carry out a diversionary amphibious raid on the northern bank of Stanley Harbour on the east coast of East Falkland island on the night of 13–14 June 1982. The plan was, as 2 PARA attacked Wireless Ridge, four Rigid Raider fast landing crafts (steered by Sergeant Buckle, Lance-Corporal Gilbert and Marines Kavanagh and Nordic) and carrying some 30 SAS soldiers from D Squadron and six SBS reinforcements from 3 section, would travel across the harbour and destroy the oil storage facilities on Cortley Ridge.

== Incursion ==
The British commando force was spotted by a National Gendarmerie Special Forces officer aboard the Argentine hospital ship ARA Almirante Irízar (preparing to collect Major José Ricardo Spadaro's 601 National Gendarmerie Special Forces Squadron on Navy Point in order to insert them behind British lines on Beagle Ridge), before it could reach the fuel tanks. This officer, quite illegally, radioed the Argentine position on the ridge to warn them of the approaching special force. A massive barrage of fire from several weapons, including eight Hispano-Suiza HS.831 30mm anti-aircraft guns from 101 Anti-Aircraft Artillery Regiment's B Battery commanded by Major Jorge Alberto Monge, was concentrated on the SAS/SBS raiders from positions along Cortley Ridge. Nevertheless, most of the raiders landed, but heavy fire by a platoon of marines under Lieutenant Héctor Gazzolo from the 3rd Marine Infantry Battalion prevented exploitation from the narrow beach, causing the SAS/SBS force to withdraw. The Argentine marines were supported by a section of sailors from the Falklands Naval Station acting as riflemen. Two Argentine defenders were killed by artillery fire aimed at Wireless Ridge. According to John Parker's book SBS: The Inside Story of The Special Boat Service (Hachette, 2013), the four Rigid Raiders were sunk or damaged beyond repair and three British Special Forces were wounded in the attack:

A six-man team from 3 SBS ... with D and G Squadrons, SAS, with the object of creating a diversionary assault from the sea ... were to move across the Murrell River by four fast power-boats ... The raiders had no option but to withdraw. One of the RRCs was badly damaged and limped back on hardly any power. The coxswain steered her by the hospital-ship for a shield and the boat died on them just as they reached the water's edge. Another sank just offshore, but close enough for the team to swim to safety ... An SBS corporal and two SAS troopers were wounded ... The RRCs were riddled with holes and had to be destroyed.

== Aftermath ==
The wisdom of this attack was later questioned in British circles as it was seen by some as a reckless operation with little strategic benefit. However, the raid scrapped a major Argentine Special Forces operation behind British lines and convinced the Argentine 10th Brigade High Command into believing that a major landing was taking place that would bring the principal buildings in Port Stanley within enemy small-arms fire. The Argentine Army Special Forces in Stanley, that were preparing with the Gendarmerie commandos for an insertion behind British lines on Beagle Ridge, were instead sent aboard the armed transport ship ARA Forrest to help Major Jorge Alberto Monge on Cortley Ridge and the National Gendarmerie Commandos on nearby Navy Point to defend the anti-aircraft guns and round-up any SAS stragglers.
