= ARA Punta Médanos =

History

Argentina
- Name: Punta Médanos
- Namesake: Punta Médanos, a point in Argentina's coast
- Ordered: 1947
- Builder: Swan, Hunter & Wigham Richardson
- Launched: 20 February 1950
- Completed: 1950
- Commissioned: 1950
- Decommissioned: 1984
- Stricken: 1985
- Identification: IMO number: 5287287
- Fate: Sunk in June 1988, while being towed to the scrapyard
- Notes: Sometimes operated as part of YPF fleet

General characteristics
- Type: Tanker
- Displacement: 16,331 tons
- Length: 153.02 m (502.0 ft)
- Beam: 18.90 m (62.0 ft)
- Draft: 10.67 m (35.0 ft)
- Propulsion: 2-shaft, 4 × marine steam turbines
- Speed: 18 knots (21 mph; 33 km/h)
- Range: 13,700 nautical miles
- Complement: 90
- Armament: none
- Notes: Career and characteristics data from "Histarmar" and "Flota YPF" websites

ARA Punta Médanos (B-18) was an auxiliary ship of the Argentine Navy, a tanker built at the Swan, Hunter & Wigham Richardson shipyard, Wallsend, in 1950. While in naval service she made several commercial trips supplementing the YPF tanker fleet, and supported the high seas fleet; in this capacity Punta Médanos participated in the Falklands War in 1982. She was decommissioned in 1984 and sold for scrapping. The vessel was named after the coastal feature of Punta Médanos, Argentina, and was the first Argentine naval ship with this name.

== Design ==
Punta Médanos was a fleet tanker built at the Swan, Hunter & Wigham Richardson shipyard at Wallsend, England, United Kingdom. She had a metal hull and superstructure, two masts, and a single funnel. Her cargo was carried in 12 tanks distributed in two holds; these were served by cranes with a maximum lift capacity of 15 ton. The cargo capacity was: 7809 m^{3} oil, 1518 m^{3} bulk cargo, and 1380 m^{3} general cargo. Her pumping capacity was 760 ton/hour.

Punta Médanos was powered by four marine steam turbines manufactured by Wallsend Shipway Engineers Ltd, fed by two oil-fired boilers, generating 11,500 HP; and driving two propellers. She carried 1,550 tons of fuel oil, with a maximum range of 13,700 nautical miles. The propulsion system allowed a maximum speed of 18 knots, making Punta Médanos the fastest tanker worldwide when she was built.

== History ==
The tanker Punta Médanos was ordered by the Argentine Government by direct contract with Swan, Hunter & Wigham Richardson shipyard, signed in October 1947; the cost was 1,035,000 sterling pounds. It was specified that she should be able to refuel underway several ships at the same time, and be able to mount defensive armament if needed.

Punta Médanos was launched on 20 February 1950, completed on 10 October, and commissioned in the Argentine Navy on 1 December same year; arriving in Argentina later that month with a naval crew led by Frigate Captain Horacio Barbitta. She was assigned to the Naval Transport Command ((in Spanish) Comando de Transportes Navales) in early 1951, where she served until 1960.

While assigned to the Naval Transport Command, Punta Médanos made several commercial trips overseas on behalf of YPF, visiting among other ports: Aruba, Curaçao, Houston, New Orleans, London, and Rotterdam. She also sailed locally, to Comodoro Rivadavia.

In 1960 Punta Médanos was reassigned to the Argentine Navy's High Sea Fleet ((in Spanish) Flota de Mar) as a support and replenishment ship, based in Puerto Belgrano Naval Base near Bahía Blanca, Argentina. As part of the fleet she participated in several sea exercises including: UNITAS III (1962), IV (1963), V (1964), VI (1965), VIII (1967), JX (1968), XI (1970), XII (1971); Atlantis I (1968); Caiman (1964), Orca (1967).

In 1961 Punta Médanos was revised and upgraded at the Buenos Aires Naval Arsenal ((in Spanish) Arsenal Naval Buenos Aires, or ANBA); (Note: ANBA later became TANDANOR.) in the summer 1962-63 she participated in the Antarctic Campaign supporting other Argentine ships. On 12 November 1963 she was involved on an UFO electromagnetic interference incident.

=== Falklands war ===
In 1982 Punta Médanos was part of the Argentine naval forces during the Falklands War. On 2 April she was part of the group providing cover to the forces involved in Operation Rosario, led by the aircraft carrier ARA Veinticinco de Mayo. On April 15, Task Force 79 (FT 79) was formed, commanded by Rear Admiral Walter Allara; Punta Médanos, commanded by Frigate Captain Iván Cohen, was assigned first to Task Group 79.2 (GT 79.2) and later to Task Group 79.4 (GT 79.4).

While operating north of the Falklands, her boilers failed and lost all propulsion; she was towed back to Puerto Madryn (about 330 miles west) by the icebreaker ARA Almirante Irízar in rough weather, the trip took about 60 hours. Punta Médanos couldn't be repaired, and was unable to continue operations during the war.

On March 28, 1983, Punta Médanos was granted the "Combat Operations" award ((in Spanish): Condecoración Operaciones de Combate) by President Reynaldo Bignone due to her participation in the war.

=== Fate ===
After the Falklands War, Punta Médanos was towed to Puerto Belgrano Naval Base, where she remained until being put out of service on February 1, 1984; finally being decommissioned and offered for sale on February 18, 1985 (Decree 305). Later in 1985 she was sold to Paul Cheng and Sons. On June 20, 1988, when being towed by the Atlantic Rescuer, the towing cable was broken and Punta Médanos sank at coordinates 34°40′S 48°49′W.

Punta Médanos was partially replaced many years later when the ex-YPF ARA Ingeniero Julio Krause was purchased. However the capability to replenish ships underway was re-established only when the ARA Patagonia (ex-French Navy Durance) was incorporated in 1999.

== See also ==
- List of auxiliary ships of the Argentine Navy
