= USS Cahuilla =

Tugboat of the United States Navy

Coordinates: 33.668382°S 59.667957°W

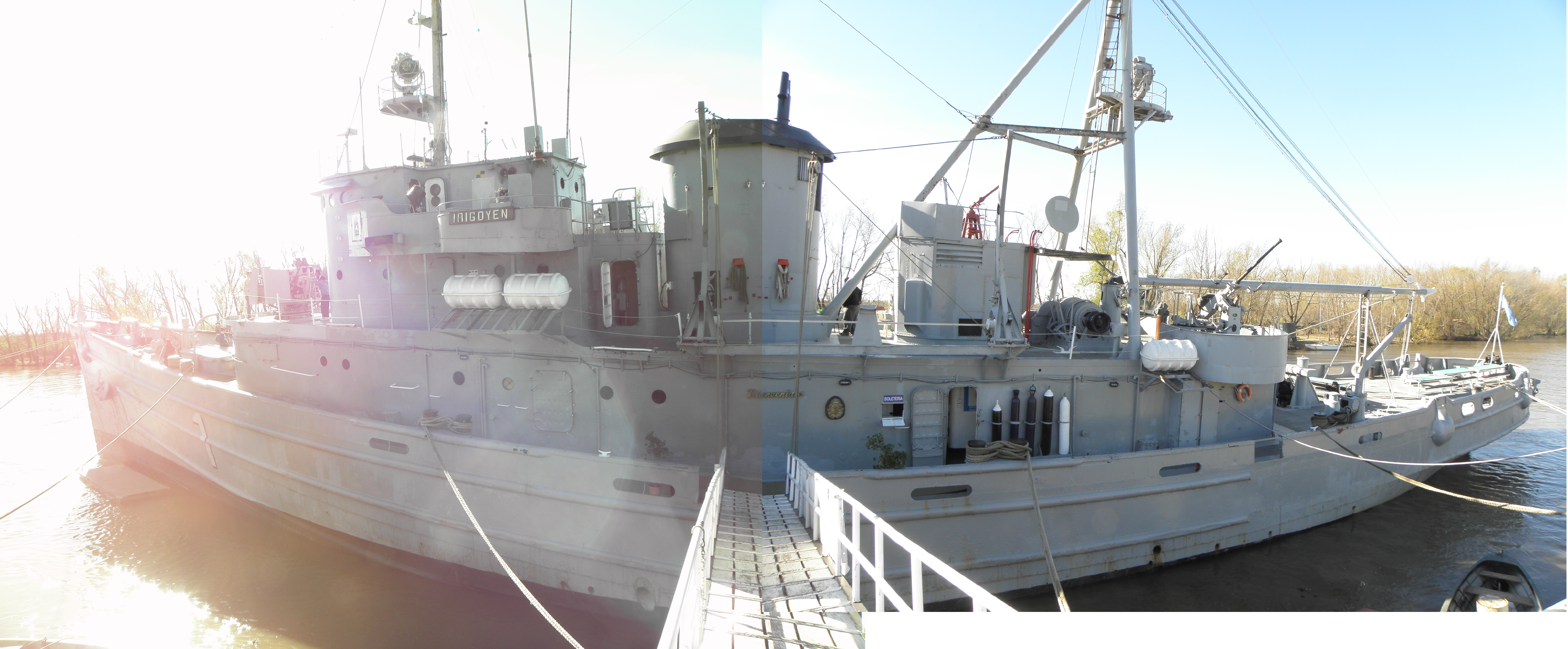

History

United States
- Name: USS Cahuilla
- Namesake: Cahuilla Native American people
- Builder: Charleston Shipbuilding & Drydock Co.
- Laid down: as Cahuilla (AT-152)
- Launched: 2 November 1944
- Commissioned: 10 March 1945
- Decommissioned: 27 June 1947
- Reclassified: Fleet Ocean Tug (ATF-152), 15 May 1944
- Stricken: 9 July 1961
- Fate: Transferred under the Security Assistance Program to Argentina, 9 July 1961

History

Argentina
- Name: ARA Comandante General Irigoyen (A-1)
- Acquired: 9 July 1961
- Out of service: 2009
- Fate: Museum ship

General characteristics
- Class & type: Abnaki class fleet tug
- Displacement: 1,240 long tons (1,260 t) light; 1,646 long tons (1,672 t) full
- Length: 205 ft (62 m)
- Beam: 38 ft 6 in (11.73 m)
- Draft: 15 ft 5 in (4.70 m)
- Propulsion: 4 × General Motors 12-278A Diesel-electric engines, 3,000 hp (2,237 kW), single screw
- Speed: 16 knots (18 mph; 30 km/h)
- Complement: 85
- Armament: 1 × 3"/50 caliber gun; 2 × twin 40 mm guns; 2 × 20 mm guns

USS Cahuilla (ATF-152) was an Abnaki class fleet tug in the service of the United States Navy during World War II. In 1961 she was sold to the Argentine Navy as ARA Irigoyen (A-1) where she served until 2009 when she became a Museum ship.

== US Navy service ==
She was laid down as Cahuilla (AT-152) at Charleston Shipbuilding and Dry Dock Co. of Charleston, South Carolina; redesignated fleet ocean tug (ATF-152) on 15 May 1944; launched on 2 November 1944; and commissioned USS Cahuilla (ATF-152) on 10 March 1945.

=== World War II Pacific Theatre operations ===
USS Cahuilla's first service to the U.S. Navy was a brief tour as antisubmarine attack teacher at Norfolk, Virginia. From there she sailed 18 April 1945 towing USS Pegasus (AK-48) for Pearl Harbor. After delivering her tow 24 May, the fleet tug sailed for Guam, where she took a string of pontoon barges in tow for Okinawa.

From 26 July to 6 August, she served to escort convoys and as rescue tug for the ships passing through the dangerous waters off Okinawa, subject to the desperate suicide attacks of Japanese aircraft.

=== End-of-War operations ===
The end of the war found USS Cahuilla at sea, bound for salvage operations at Eniwetok, from which she returned to take part in the occupation of Nagasaki, Japan, until 16 October. From that time she was based on Okinawa for rescue and tow operations until 14 February 1946.

USS Cahuilla continued to offer towing service to fleet units, and rescue work to naval and merchant ships, calling at Pearl Harbor, Kwajalein, and ports of the west coast and Panama Canal Zone until January 1947.

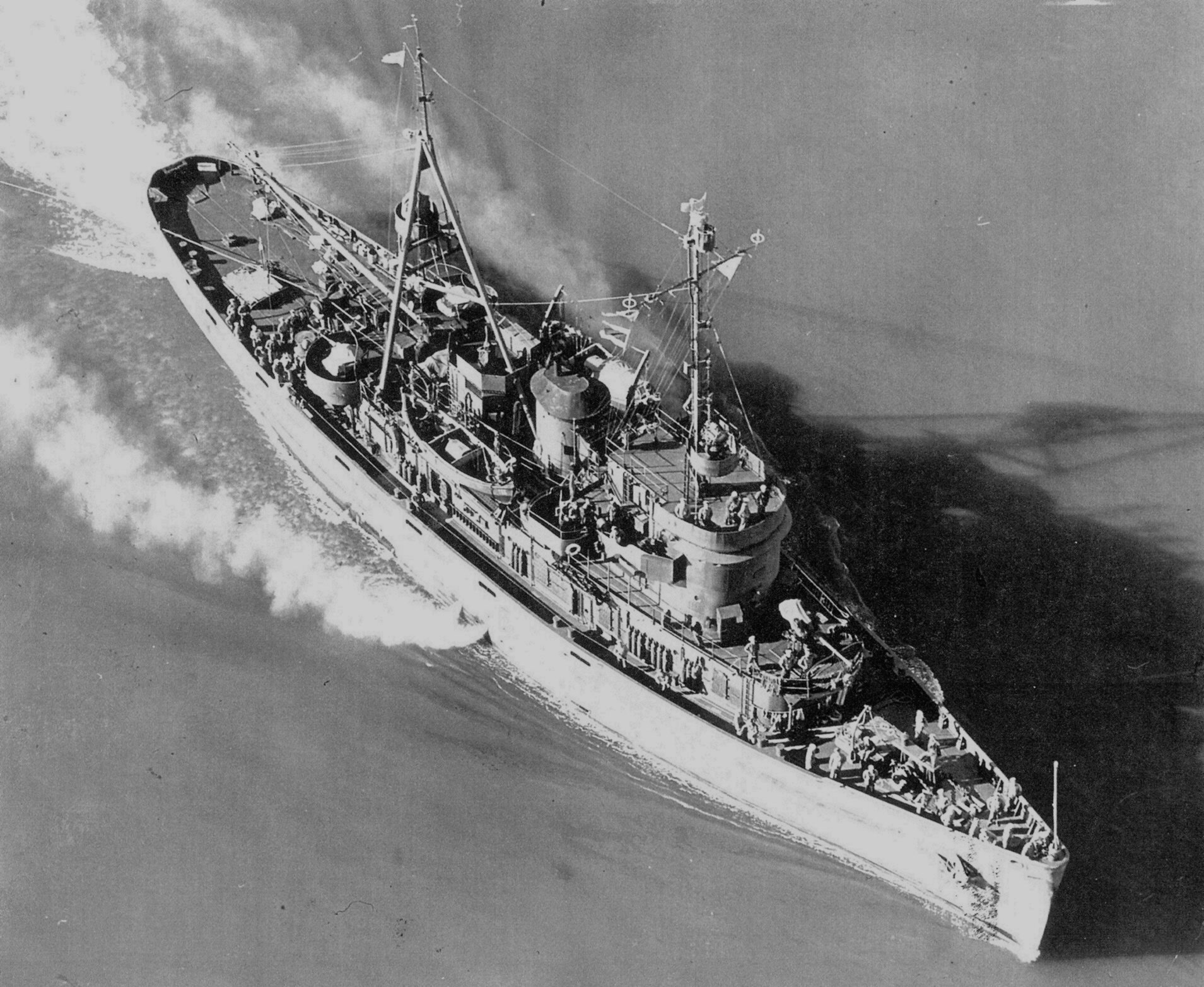
Cahuilla passes beneath Golden Gate Bridge in 1946

=== Decommissioning ===
USS Cahuilla was decommissioned on 27 June 1947 at San Diego, California. Laid up in the Pacific Reserve Fleet, she was struck from the Naval Register and later transferred, under the Security Assistance Program, to Argentina on 9 July 1961.

== Argentine Navy service ==
In 1961 the tug was acquired by the Argentine Navy as an Aviso and renamed ARA Comandante General Irigoyen (A-1) in honor of Spaniard Don Matías de Irigoyen y de la Quintana who was War Secretary between 1815 and 1819. Commandante General Irigoyen carried out search and rescue activities in the Falklands War, in the area of Task Force 50.

A helicopter belonging to the ARA HÉRCULES was rescued from the sea in the area delimited as TOAS, almost 30 miles from the coast. the operation was risky since the unit was 30 meters deep and the divers had to sterilize all of its anti-submarine configuration that was activated by water pressure, then it went to Puerto Deseado to relieve the ARA Somellera Warning After the transfer of its antenna, the specific mission, in addition to being a search and rescue unit, was to support all the aircraft that went to and returned from Malvinas, the antenna was placed on the ship to carry out trigonometry so that the Argentine planes could locate on the continent the area called FT 50 under the command of Rear Admiral RE, now deceased, Héctor Martini. It is paradoxical that both the Sobral and the Somellera, together with the Area Chief, were considered Malvinas War Veterans and the ARA Irigoyen was not, fulfilling the same or more missions in the same geographical location on hot dates of the war and within the TOAS, That is why today in Naval jargon it is called "the ghost ship" https://avisoarairigoyen.blogspot.com/ . It also served as an Antarctic support and practice and training ship for divers and submarines. On September 29, 2009, with 400,000 miles sailed in the Argentine Sea, it was finally retired. During her career she also acted as an Antarctic support ship and as a submarine force divers training ship. On 29 September 2009 after 400.000 miles sailed in the South Atlantic, she was finally retired.

=== Museum ===
In January 2010, she was transferred to the care of the municipality of San Pedro, Buenos Aires Province and permanently moored as the Buque Museo Irigoyen, the third Argentine museum ship, opening to the public in May 2010. On 5 November 2020 the tug was found to be listing dangerously after taking water and assistance was sought from the Navy to prevent her sinking or breaking free.

== See also ==
- List of auxiliary ships of the Argentine Navy
