= ARA Ingeniero Julio Krause =

History

Argentina
- Name: Ingeniero Julio Krause
- Namesake: Julio Krause
- Ordered: 1975
- Builder: ASTARSA shipyard, Argentina
- Yard number: 144
- Launched: 21 January 1981
- Commissioned: 1993
- Decommissioned: 2013
- Identification: IMO number: 7725348; Pennant number: B-13
- Fate: Sunk as target in 2016

General characteristics
- Type: Oil tanker
- Displacement: 8,330 t (8,200 long tons) full load
- Length: 111.80 m (366 ft 10 in)
- Beam: 17.2 m (56 ft 5 in)
- Draught: 6.71 m (22 ft 0 in)
- Propulsion: 1 Sulzer 8ZL 40/48 4T SA diesel engine, 4,300 kW (5,800 hp), 1 shaft
- Speed: 14 knots (26 km/h)
- Capacity: 15 tanks containing 8,350 m^{3} (52,500 bbl) of liquid fuel
- Complement: 35
- Notes: characteristics from “Histarmar” website.

ARA Ingeniero Julio Krause (B-13) was an oil tanker in service with the Argentine Navy from 1993 to 2015, and with YPF from to 1981 to 1993. She was the first ship in the Argentine Navy to bear the name of Argentine engineer Julio Krause, who discovered oil in Comodoro Rivadavia in 1907.

== Design ==
Ingeniero Julio Krause was an oil tanker originally ordered by the Argentine oil company YPF (Yacimientos Petrolíferos Fiscales) in the early 1980s, designed and built by the Argentine ASTARSA shipyard, at Buenos Aires, Argentina. The design allowed the ship to operate in both littoral and fluvial service.

Ingeniero Julio Krause had a steel single-bottom hull and the superstructure at the stern, with a single tripod mast and a large single funnel atop, behind the bridge; the cargo area was located in the middle of the ship and comprised 15 liquid cargo tanks with a capacity of 8,350 cubic metres (52,500 bbl) served by three pumps, each able to transfer 500 m^{3} (3,100 bbl)/hour.

Ingeniero Julio Krause was powered by one eight-cylinder Sulzer 8 ZL 40/48 4T SA marine diesel engine of 4,300 kilowatts (5,800 hp) at 550 rpm, (Note: The engine was manufactured at AFNE Río Santiago shipyard under license.) driving one variable-pitch propeller; with a maximum speed of 14.5 knots (26.9 km/h; 16.7 mph).

== History ==
Ingeniero Julio Krause was ordered by the Argentine oil company YPF for its tanker fleet, laid down in 1980 and launched on 21 January 1981 at the ASTARSA shipyard; the ship was named after engineer Julio Krause, who in 1907 discovered oil in Comodoro Rivadavia, Argentine Patagonia. She was incorporated to YPF's fleet later in 1981, and was sold to the Argentine Navy on 5 March 1993 at a price of USD3.4 million. Ingeniero Julio Krause was commissioned later in 1993 with the same name, and was assigned to the Naval Transport Service (Servicio de Transportes Navales) with the pennant number B-13.

In addition to supporting the Navy’s operations, Ingeniero Julio Krause also provided transport services to private companies, especially YPF. In 2007 Ingeniero Julio Krause underwent corrective and preventive maintenance that allowed her to remain in permanent operational readiness. She carried out one logistic deployment supporting the Argentine fleet, and 28 maritime transport trips due to the increase in the consumption of gas oil in Argentina. These operations were carried out both in fluvial and oceanic coastal environments, including the ports of Zárate, Buenos Aires, and Montevideo.

In 2008 Ingeniero Julio Krause supported the deployment of the corvettes ARA Rosales and ARA Robinson to South Africa, to participate in Exercise ATLASUR VII — a military exercise regarding the ship's use of refueling navy ships.

In 2009, Ingeniero Julio Krause did not sail either supporting the fleet or private chartered due to union action starting in March; instead she underwent corrective and preventive maintenance at Puerto Belgrano Naval Base, and Tandanor shipyard from October to November.

In October 2010, the ship was given to the Argentine Navy. The ship was used in a variety of missions the Argentine Navy executed.

In November 2013, Ingeniero Julio Krause was declared out of service due to her structural and equipment degradation. The ship also was inspected and declared unsafe by officials in 2015. The reason being because the ship lacked a double hull – vital for oil tankers. In September 2015, via decree 2041/2015, President Cristina Fernández de Kirchner authorized her use as a target ship for weapons training by the Argentine Navy fleet. She was sunk in early 2016 in the Argentine Sea after being hit with six anti-ship weaponry such as the Exocet missiles and one SST-4 torpedo.

== See also ==
- Architecture of the oil tanker
- List of auxiliary ships of the Argentine Navy
