= ARA Isla de los Estados =

Argentine Navy ship

Coordinates: 51°42′3″S 59°29′22″W

History

Argentina
- Name: Isla de los Estados
- Namesake: Isla de los Estados
- Builder: Sociedad Metalúrgica Duro Felguera, Gijón, Spain
- Yard number: 122
- Launched: 1975, as Trans-Bética
- In service: 22 December 1980
- Identification: IMO number: 7403718
- Fate: Sunk, 11 May 1982

General characteristics
- Type: Cargo ship
- Tonnage: 3,900 GRT
- Length: 81.4 m (267 ft 1 in)
- Beam: 13.4 m (44 ft 0 in)
- Draught: 4.5 m (14 ft 9 in)
- Propulsion: Diesel engine, single screw
- Speed: 14 knots (26 km/h; 16 mph)
- Complement: 27

Service record
- Part of: Argentine Navy, Naval Transport Service
- Operations: Operation Rosario

ARA Isla de los Estados was an Argentine Navy supply ship sunk during the Falklands War.

== Ship history ==
The 3,900-ton ship was built in 1975 by the Sociedad Metalúrgica Duro Felguera in Gijón, Spain, as Trans-Bética. She was acquired by the Argentine Navy, renamed after the island east of Tierra del Fuego, and commissioned into the Naval Transport Service on 22 December 1980, being used to maintain a regular transport service between the Falkland Islands and the mainland.

=== Falklands war ===
On 28 March 1982 she sailed from Puerto Deseado to participate in Operation Rosario in the Falkland Islands, arriving on 4 April, three days after the initial landings, to provide transport around the archipelago.

The ship, among many other things, transported troops to occupy Darwin, Goose Green and Fox Bay.

Between 15 and 17 April she sowed mines in the waters surrounding Stanley. These mines had been carried by the ARA Bahia Buen Suceso.

=== Sinking ===
Isla de los Estados was sunk by HMS Alacrity during the first hours of 11 May 1982 in a surface action north of the Swan Islands in Falkland Sound. Alacrity engaged Isla de los Estados with her 4.5-inch gun. The Argentine transport blew up after several hits ignited her cargo of jet fuel and ammunition. Only two of the 24 men aboard survived; 15 crew members and seven servicemen (from all three armed forces plus the coast guard) were killed or missing.

== See also ==
- List of auxiliary ships of the Argentine Navy
