= Kidney Island =

- Island
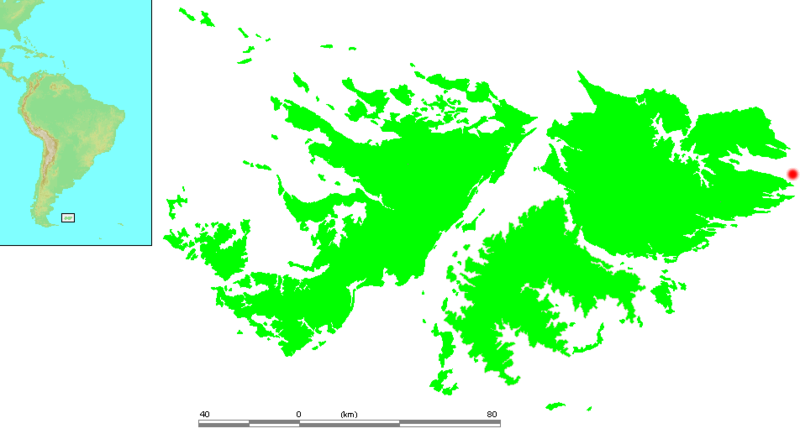
- Location of Kidney Island within the Falkland Islands
- Coordinates: 51°37′27″S 57°45′03″W
- Country: Falkland Islands

Area
  - Total: 0.33 km^{2} (0.13 sq mi)
- Time zone: UTC−3 (FKST)
- If shown, area and population ranks are for all islands and all inhabited islands in the Falklands respectively.

Kidney Island (Spanish: Isla Celebroña) so called due to its shape, is a small island with a land area of 33 hectares (82 acres), to the east of East Falkland, not far from Stanley. It lies is at the east end of Berkeley Sound near Kidney Cove, and is separated from Port William by Menguera Point. It is a nature reserve and, unlike most of the main islands, is still covered in tussac grass. Its wildlife includes penguins and sea lions. It is one of only three places in the archipelago where king penguins breed; the others are Saunders Island and Volunteer Point on East Falkland.

== History ==
During the Falklands War, on 1 May 1982, Islas Malvinas GC82, an Argentine Z-28 type naval patrol boat was damaged near the island by a Westland Lynx HAS.Mk.2/3 helicopter from HMS Alacrity. The helicopter was also badly hit by return fire from the Argentine armed coaster ARA Forrest.

== Important Bird Area ==
Kidney Island, together with the nearby and much smaller Cochon Island, has been identified by BirdLife International as an Important Bird Area (IBA). Birds for which the site is of conservation significance include Falkland steamer ducks (15 breeding pairs), southern rockhopper penguins (500 pairs), Magellanic penguins, white-chinned petrels (1000 pairs), sooty shearwaters, blackish cinclodes and Cobb's wrens.
