= ARA General San Martín =

Argentine icebreaker

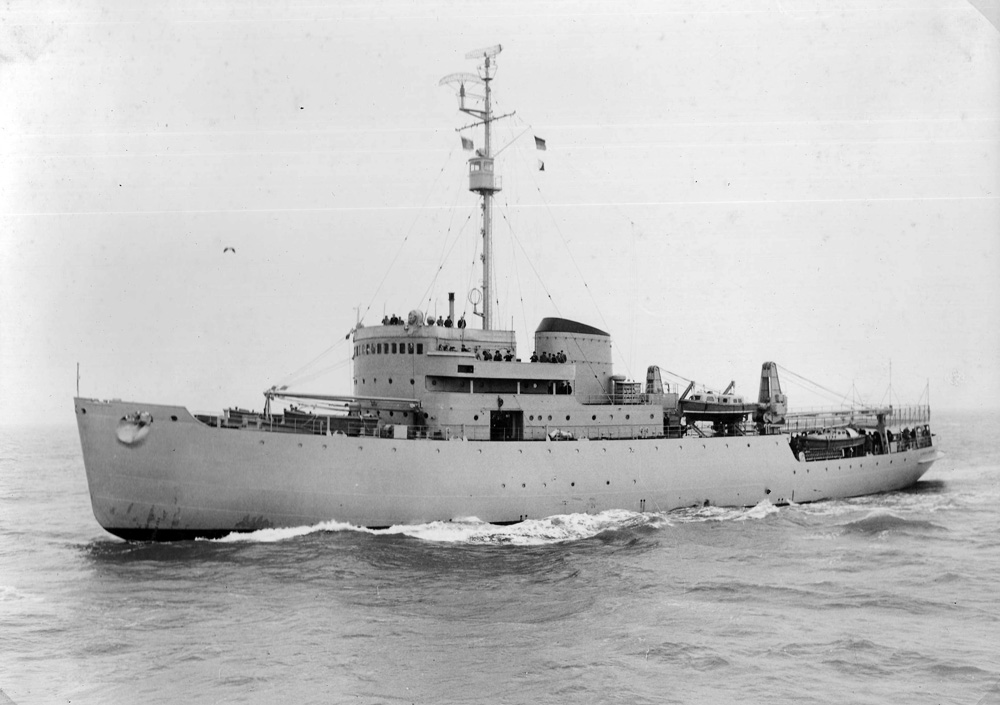

History

Argentina
- Name: ARA General San Martín
- Namesake: José de San Martín
- Owner: Argentine Navy
- Ordered: 1950
- Builder: Germany Shipyard Seebeckwerft of Wese A.C., Bremerhaven
- Launched: 24 June 1954
- In service: 1954–1982
- Out of service: 1982
- Identification: IMO number: 5128039
- Fate: Scrapped

General characteristics (as built)
- Type: Icebreaker
- Displacement: 4,854 tn (dry) 5,301 tn (standard)
- Length: 85 m (279 ft)
- Beam: 18.6 m (61 ft)
- Draught: 9.85 m (32.3 ft)
- Installed power: 7100 Steam horse
- Propulsion: 2 Diesel engine MAN SE
- Speed: 16 knots (30 km/h; 18 mph) (max)
- Range: 35,000 miles at 10 knots
- Crew: 160
- Aircraft carried: An airplane and a helicopter
- Aviation facilities: Helipad and hangar

ARA General San Martín was the first icebreaker of the Argentine Navy. She participated in several Antarctic campaigns of Argentina between 1954 and 1982. She received the name of José de San Martín.

For twenty-five years she drew his sea routes in the southern seas, which enabled the summer and winter campaigns. She carried out numerous research and relief assistance missions to ships, navigators and expeditionaries; she facilitated the foundation of refuges and Antarctic bases, the replacement of the endowments, the exploration of the Weddell Sea and the accomplishment of oceanographic tasks, hydrographic and meteorological investigations in Argentine Antarctica.

== Historical record ==
The icebreaker General San Martín icebreaker was built at the Bremerhaven shipyard (Germany) by the Seebeckwerft company of Weser A.G., Bremerhaven. The laying of the icebreaker's keel took place on 1 March 1954 and was launched on 24 June 1954. She arrived in Argentina same year under the leadership of the captain Luis Tristán de Villalobos.

She was the first icebreaker of the Argentine Navy. For twenty-five years she has traced maritime routes over the frozen Antarctic seas, making her way to carry out the summer and winter campaigns. For this, she has carried out numerous search and rescue missions to the boat, the navigators and the expeditions; she facilitated the founding of refuges and Antarctic bases, replenishing them, relaying their endowments, exploring the confines of the Weddell Sea and performing oceanographic, hydrographic and meteorological research tasks throughout the world of Argentine Antarctica.
