= HMS Alacrity (F174) =

Type 21 or Amazon-class frigate of the Royal Navy and Pakistan Navy

History

United Kingdom
- Name: HMS Alacrity
- Builder: Yarrow Shipbuilders
- Commissioned: 2 July 1977
- Decommissioned: 1 March 1994
- Identification: Pennant number: F174
- Motto: Adjuvero propero; (Latin: "I hasten to help")
- Fate: Sold to Pakistan on 1 March 1994

Pakistan
- Name: PNS Badr
- Commissioned: 1 March 1994
- Decommissioned: April 2013
- Status: Decommissioned

General characteristics
- Class & type: Type 21 frigate
- Displacement: 3,250 tons full load
- Length: 384 ft (117 m)
- Beam: 41 ft 9 in (12.73 m)
- Draught: 19 ft 6 in (5.94 m)
- Propulsion: COGOG: 2 × Rolls-Royce Olympus gas turbines; 2 × Rolls-Royce Tyne RM1A gas turbines for cruising
- Speed: 32 knots (59 km/h; 37 mph)
- Range: 4,000 nautical miles at 17 knots (7,400 km at 31 km/h); 1,200 nautical miles at 30 knots (2,220 km at 56 km/h)
- Complement: 177
- Armament: RN: 1 × 4.5 inch (114 mm) Mark 8 naval gun; 2 × Oerlikon 20 mm cannon; 4 × MM38 Exocet missiles; 1 × quadruple Sea Cat SAMs; 2 × triple ASW torpedo tubes; 2 × Corvus chaff launchers; 1 × Type 182 towed decoy; Pakistan: 1 × 4.5 inch (114 mm) Mark 8 naval gun; 2 × Oerlikon 20 mm cannon; 1 × Phalanx CIWS; 2 × 4-cell Harpoon SSM launchers; 2 × triple STWS-1 torpedo launchers (for Mk 46 torpedoes); 2 × Mark 36 SRBOC chaff launchers; 1 × Type 182 towed decoy
- Aircraft carried: 1 × Westland Wasp helicopter, later refitted for 1 × Lynx

HMS Alacrity was a Type 21 frigate of the Royal Navy.

Alacrity was active during the Falklands War of 1982, where she sank a supply ship, survived Exocet-missile attacks and rescued men from the Atlantic Conveyor. She was transferred to Pakistan on 1 March 1994 and renamed PNS Badr.

== Background ==
Built by Yarrow Shipbuilders Ltd, Glasgow, Scotland, she was completed with Exocet launchers in 'B' position.

== Royal Navy service ==
=== 1977–1981 ===
In 1977, Alacrity participated in the Fleet Review of the Royal Navy at Spithead to celebrate HM the Queen's Silver Jubilee. In 1980, Alacrity participated in a Far-East deployment. During a visit to Shanghai, she was the first British warship to enter the Yangtse River since HMS Amethyst escaped in 1949.

=== Falklands War ===
Alacrity participated in the Falklands War, departing Devonport on 5 April 1982 and captained by Commander Christopher Craig.

An Argentine bomb slightly damaged Alacrity on 1 May 1982. The same day, Alacrity's Lynx helicopter carried out a machine-gun attack against the coastguard Islas Malvinas and the armed coastal transport ARA Forrest near Kidney island, damaging both. The helicopter had to withdraw after being damaged in the exchange of fire with the Forrest.

On the night of 10–11 May 1982, Alacrity was tasked to establish if the Argentines had mined the north entrance of Falkland Sound. While approaching Swan Islands, she engaged and sank the 3000-ton Argentine supply ship ARA Isla de los Estados with her 4.5-inch gun. The Argentine transport blew up after a hit ignited her cargo of jet fuel and ammunition. Fifteen crew members and seven servicemen (from all three armed forces and the coast guard) were killed, there were only two survivors.

As Alacrity left the channel just before dawn, her sister ship Arrow was waiting to accompany her back to the Task Force, when the Argentine submarine, San Luis, captained by Fernando Azcueta, fired two SST-4 torpedoes at a range of 5000 yards. One didn't leave its tube, the other missed and was heard to detonate after hitting the sea bottom.

On 25 May, Alacrity sustained damage to her bow while rescuing survivors from the SS Atlantic Conveyor, which two Exocet missiles had struck.

=== 1982–1994 ===
As with the other surviving Type 21 frigates, Alacrity's hull was cracking by the mid-1980s. She was refitted, and a steel plate was welded down each side of the ship.

In 1989, while deployed as a West Indies guard ship, Alacrity was tasked for humanitarian relief on the island of Montserrat in the British West Indies after the island suffered devastation in the wake of Hurricane Hugo. The ship's Lynx helicopter was the sole means of transporting aid ashore as the port was destroyed.

== Pakistan Navy service ==
Alacrity was decommissioned and transferred to Pakistan on 1 March 1994, being renamed Badr. Exocet was not transferred to Pakistan, and Badr had her obsolete Sea Cat launcher removed and replaced with a Phalanx CIWS. Signaal DA08 air search radar replaced the Type 992 and SRBOC chaff launchers, and new 20 mm and additional 30 mm guns were fitted.

Between 11 and 21 May 2008, Badr participated in Exercise Inspired Union, a multi-national North Arabian Sea exercise. Other Pakistani warships included the frigate Shah Jahan, the replenishment tanker Nasr, the Pakistan Air Force explosive ordnance disposal team, and the American destroyers Curts and Ross.

Badr was decommissioned in April 2013 by the Pakistan Navy.

== Publications ==
Colledge, J. J.; Warlow, Ben (2006) [1969]. Ships of the Royal Navy: The Complete Record of All Fighting Ships of the Royal Navy from the 15th Century to the Present (3rd Rev ed.). London: Chatham Publishing. ISBN 978-1-86176-281-8. OCLC 67375475.
