= ARA Almirante Irízar =

Argentine naval icebreaker built in 1979

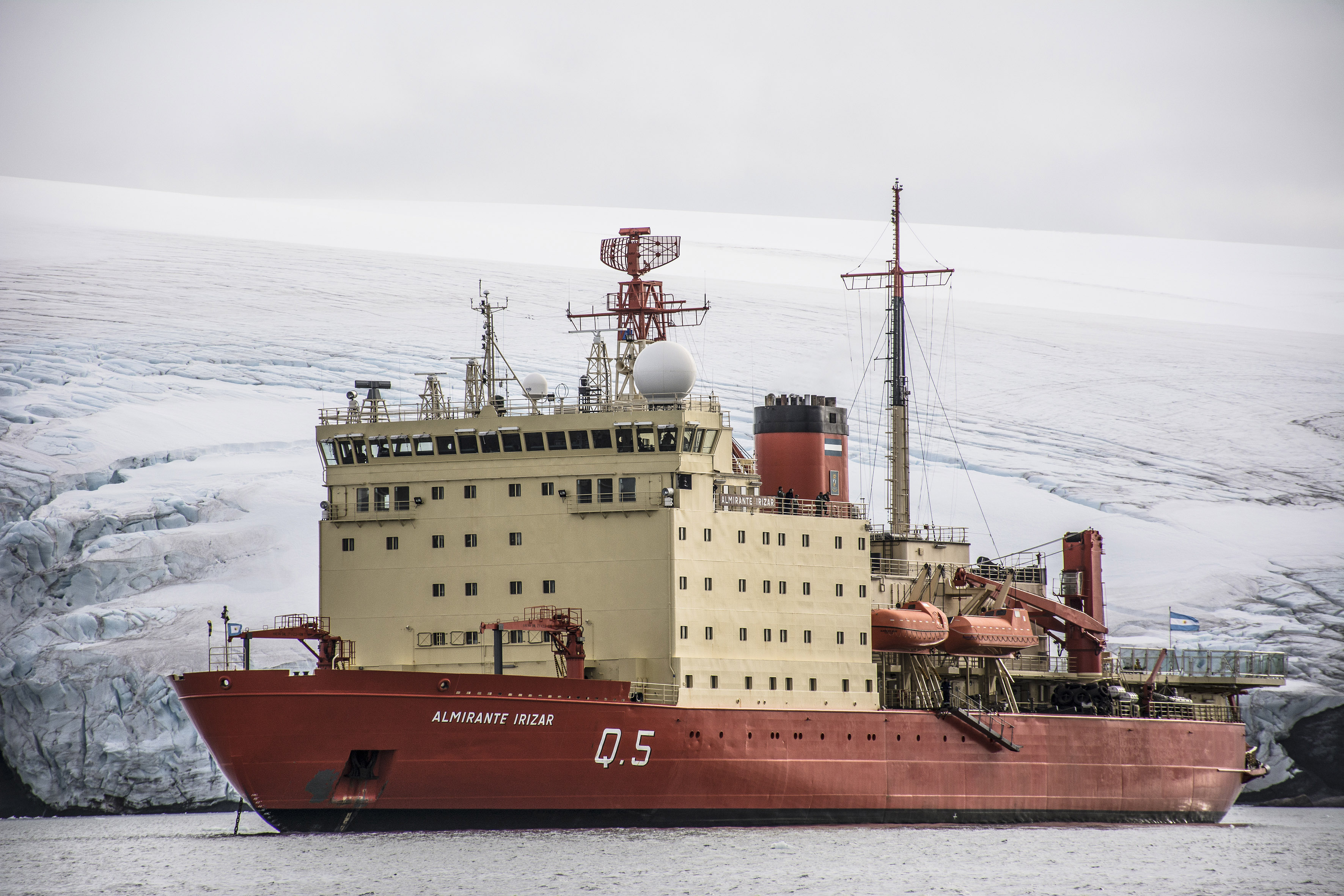

History

Argentina
- Name: Almirante Irízar
- Namesake: Julián Irízar
- Owner: Argentine Navy
- Ordered: 17 December 1975
- Builder: Wärtsilä Helsinki Shipyard, Finland
- Yard number: 420
- Laid down: 4 July 1977
- Launched: 3 February 1978
- Completed: 15 December 1978
- In service: 1979–2007; 2017–present
- Identification: Call sign: LOAI; IMO number: 7533628; MMSI number: 701808000
- Status: Undergoing sea trials after refit

General characteristics (as built)
- Type: Icebreaker
- Displacement: 14,899 tons
- Length: 121.3 m (398 ft)
- Beam: 25.2 m (83 ft)
- Draft: 9.5 m (31 ft)
- Installed power: 4 × Wärtsilä-Pielstick 8PC2-5L (4 × 3,828 kW)
- Propulsion: Diesel-electric; two shafts; Two DC propulsion motors (2 × 5,950 kW); Two fixed-pitch propellers
- Speed: 16.5 knots (30.6 km/h; 19.0 mph) (max); 3 knots (5.6 km/h; 3.5 mph) in 1 m (3.3 ft) ice
- Endurance: 60 days
- Complement: 245
- Sensors & processing systems: Plessey AWS-2 radar
- Aircraft carried: 2 × H-3 Sea King, or; 2 × Super Puma
- Aviation facilities: Helipad and hangar

General characteristics (changes in refit)
- Installed power: 4 × MAN 9L32/40 (4 × 4,500 kW)
- Propulsion: Diesel-electric, two shafts; Two propulsion motors (2 × 6,500 kW); Two fixed-pitch propellers
- Complement: 313

ARA Almirante Irízar (Q-5) is a large icebreaker of the Argentine Navy. She was ordered from a shipyard in Finland in 1975.

A fire broke out in her auxiliary generator compartment in 2007, putting her out of commission for a decade, until April 2017.

== Background ==
The ship was named after Admiral Julián Irízar. In 1903, when he held the rank of Lieutenant, he commanded the Argentine corvette ARA Uruguay during a successful mission to rescue the Swedish Antarctic Expedition of Professor Otto Nordenskjöld, after the expedition had been trapped by the Antarctic winter.

Almirante Irízar was built at the Wärtsilä Helsinki Shipyard in Finland, under a contract signed in 1975 between the Argentine Navy and the shipyard. Irízar was launched in February 1978 and was formally commissioned on December that year, arriving in Argentina on 23 March 1979. She replaced the elderly icebreaker ARA General San Martín, which was then retired from active service.

Almirante Irízar's peacetime missions include annual campaigns to resupply and rotate the personnel assigned to the Argentine Antarctic outposts, as well as conducting and supporting scientific endeavors in Antarctica. She has also conducted several passenger tours to Patagonia and the Antarctic.

The ship's homeport is at the Argentine Navy's Buenos Aires Naval Anchorage (Spanish: Apostadero Naval Buenos Aires) in the capital city of Buenos Aires.

== Service ==
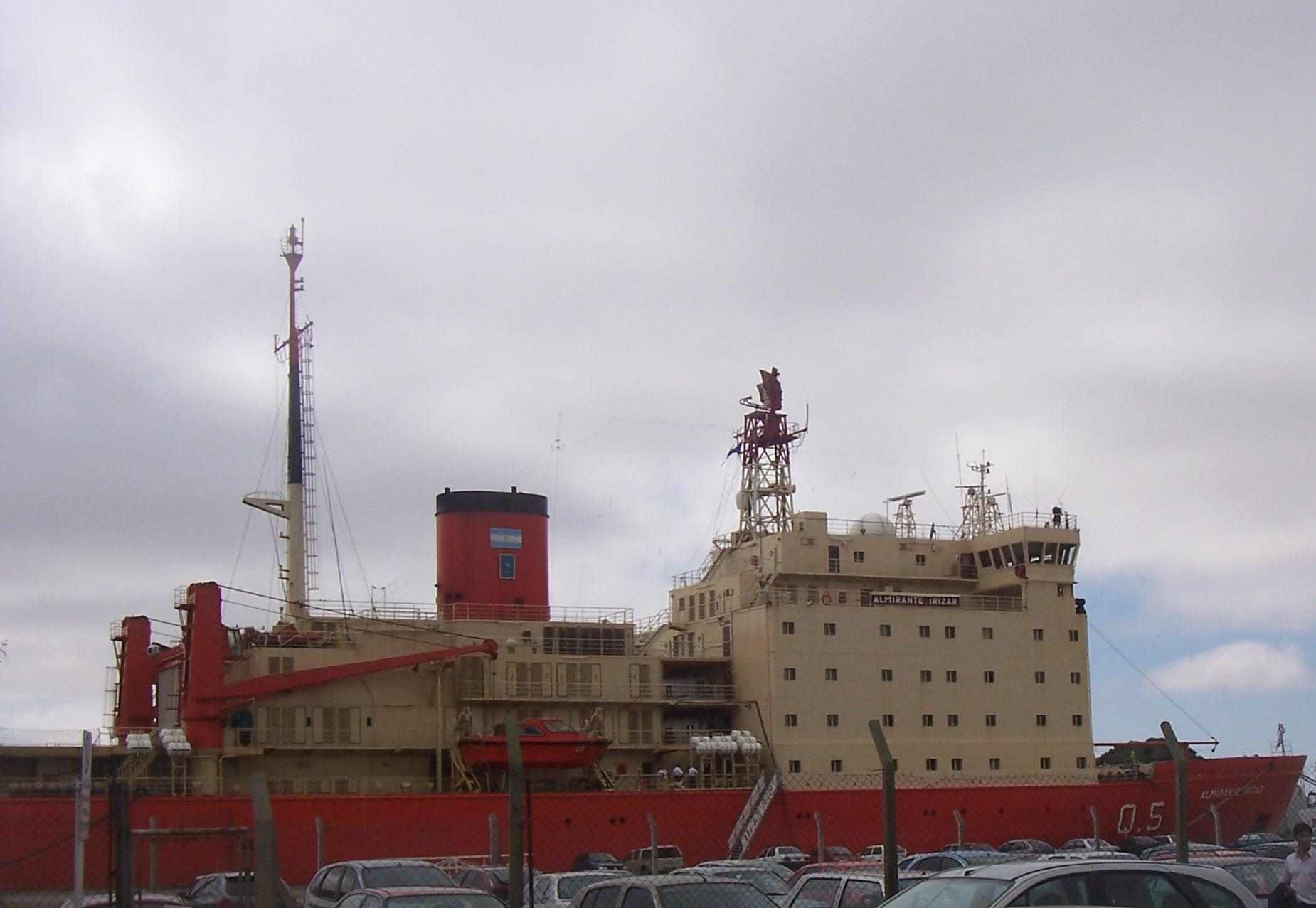
ARA Almirante Irízar docked at her homeport in Buenos Aires, Argentina.

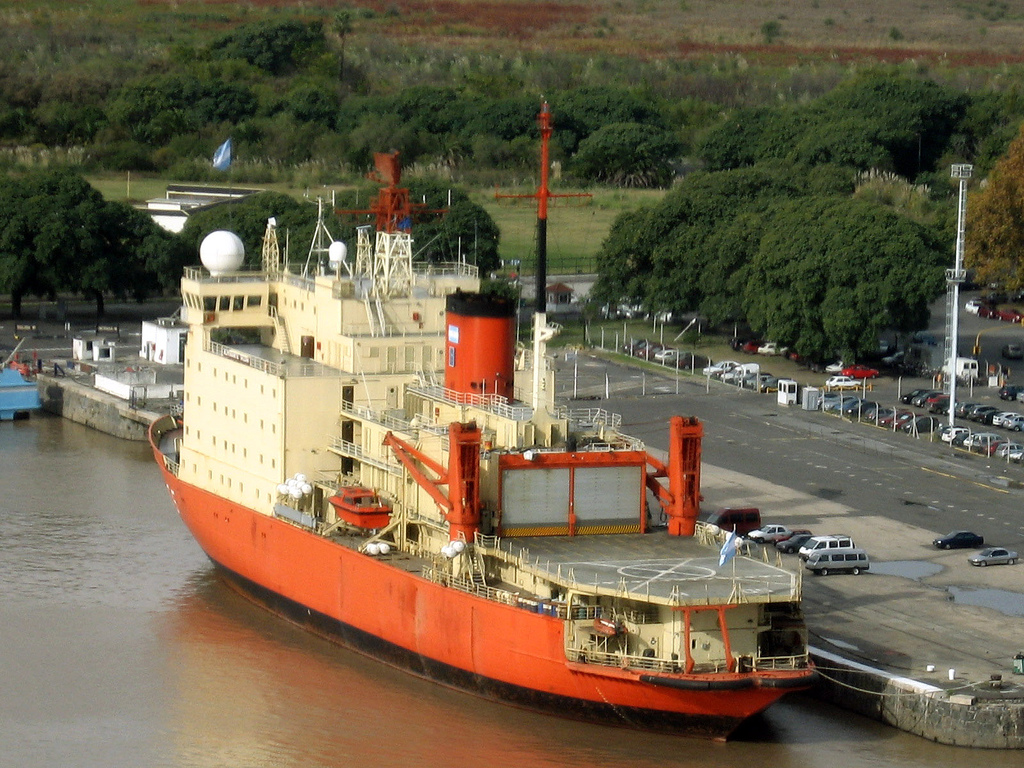
ARA Almirante Irízar as seen from above, showing hangars and landing deck.

During the Falklands War (Spanish: Guerra de Malvinas) the vessel served as troop transport on the 2 April operation and then as a hospital ship, Helicopters departing from Almirante Irizar's helipad landed Argentine troops on Darwin and Fox Bay on 2 April 1982.

In April 1982, while operating north of the Falklands, the boilers of tanker ARA Punta Médanos failed and she lost all propulsion; Almirante Irízar towed her back to Puerto Madryn (about 330 miles west) in rough weather, the trip took about 60 hours. Punta Médanos couldn't be repaired, and was unable to continue operations during the war.

After the end of the war, she was converted into a hospital ship.

The ship gained attention in 2002, when she attempted to rescue the supply vessel Magdalena Oldendorff, which was trapped in pack ice off Antarctica. Even though Irízar failed to break Magdalena Oldendorff free, she managed to move it to a safer position and resupply the ship with food, medicine and medical personnel until the ice melted and Magdalena Oldendorff could return to open sea.

=== 2004 incident ===
On 15/16 March 2004, the ship entered a maritime area designated as conservation zones under the jurisdiction of the Falkland Islands and issued demands for other ships to identify themselves. This prompted a protest from the British government to the Argentine government over its policing of seas under Falkland jurisdiction. The diplomatic note also re-asserted British sovereignty over the islands.

=== 2007 fire ===
On 10 April 2007 at 22:00 UTC−03:00, a massive fire broke out in the auxiliary generator compartment of Almirante Irízar. By midnight, captain Guillermo Tarapow had issued orders to the evacuate the vessel. Argentine Navy and Argentine Coast Guard aircraft, including P-3 Orion and Hercules C-130 aircraft, operated to keep track of the 24 lifeboats. The 296 persons aboard the icebreaker —including civilians of the Antarctic bases— were helped by the nearest ships, the Panamanian tanker Scarlet Ibis and a Uruguayan fishing vessel. The icebreaker was returning from its annual Antarctic summer campaign, and the incident took place some 140 miles (230 km) east of Puerto Madryn.

The crew arrived safely in Puerto Madryn on 12 April. There were no casualties.

The vessel's captain remained aboard alone for almost 24 hours after seeing his crew safely evacuated from the ship. Starting 11 April, destroyer ARA Almirante Brown, corvettes ARA Granville, and ARA Robinson, avisos ARA Gurruchaga, ARA Suboficial Castillo, and ARA Teniente Olivieri, and Coast Guard PNA Thompson, surrounded the icebreaker and began rescue operations. Buzos Tacticos and members of the Rescue Team (Spanish: Servicio de Salvamento) of the Argentine Navy boarded the ship and extinguished the fire. On 18 April, the ship started being towed to the Puerto Belgrano naval base. Irizar finally arrived in Puerto Belgrano on 20 April.

The fire caused the loss of the two Sea King helicopters stored in their hangar, worth US$18 million each. These have been replaced by four Sea Kings transferred from the US government.

Following this incident the British government offered to supply Argentine bases in Antarctica in support of scientific missions, using HMS Endurance. This offer was turned down by the Argentine government, instead they leased the Russian icebreaking vessel Vasily Golovnin for the subsequent Antarctic summer campaigns at a cost of US$2m/month. The Dutch cargo vessel Timca was hired for the 2012/13 campaign. Vasily Golovnin would again carry out the following Antarctic campaign.

=== Upgrade ===
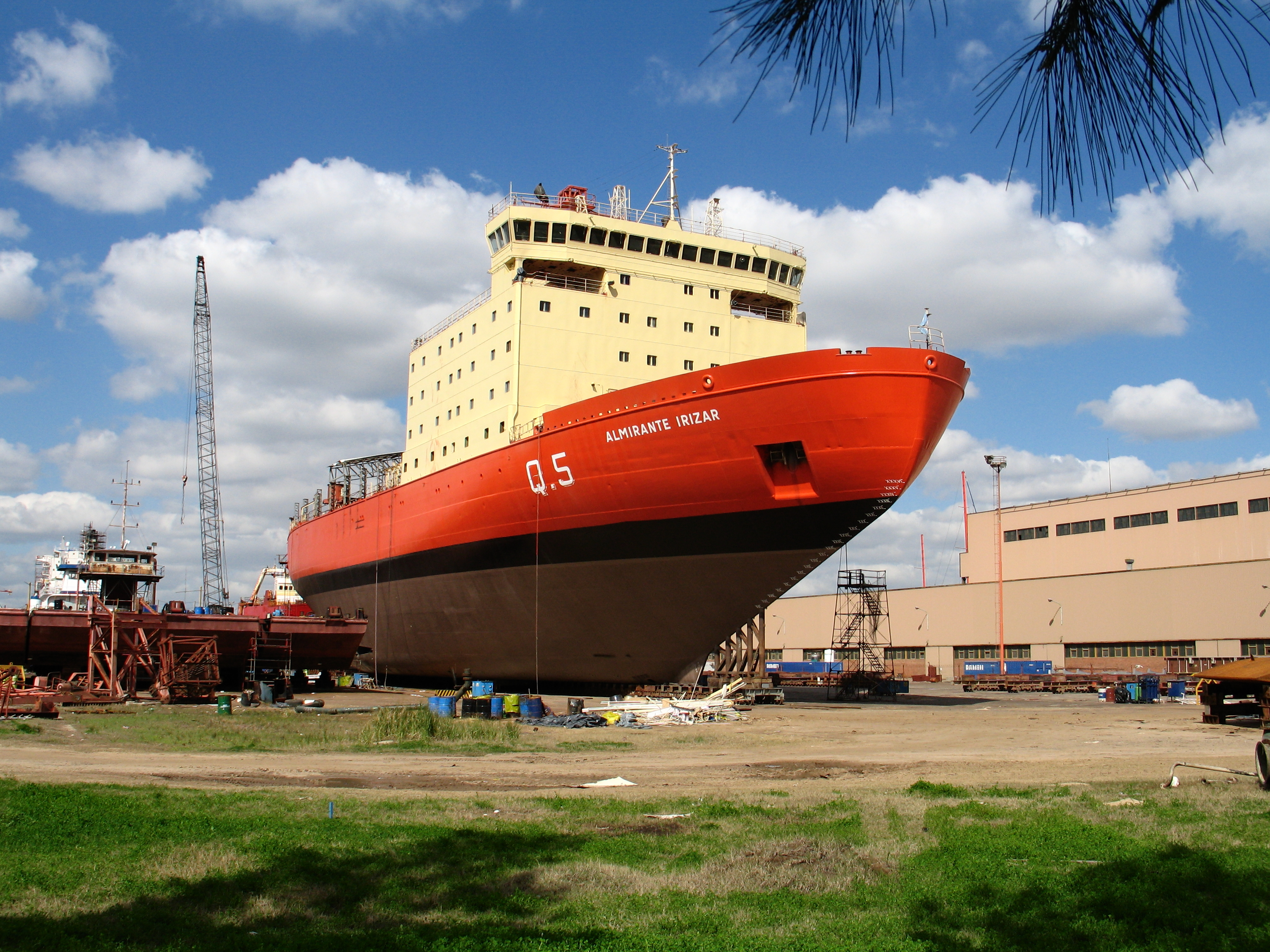
Almirante Irízar undergoing repairs at Tandanor shipyard in 2011.

After a long period in Puerto Belgrano due to legal issues surrounding the incident, Irízar finally arrived in Buenos Aires on 3 September 2008 to be taken to Tandanor's shipyard for repairs. Repairs were expected to be completed in 2010 but continued into 2011, and were supervised by Norwegian shipyard Aker Yards. As of November 2012, the refit had thus far cost over US$100 million and the ship was not expected to be ready until late 2013. In April 2013, it was disclosed that the ship was still awaiting the necessary repairs and that sea trials had been delayed by a year, with oppositors claiming the money spent —some US$200 million plus another US$75 million in contracting supplying vessels— could have been used to buy a new ship; a month later, it was announced that work regarding control panels was still pending.

The Tandanor shipyard repaired the fire damage and also reconfigured the vessel to increase laboratory space from 74 m^{2} (800 sq ft) up to 415 m^{2} (4,470 sq ft). This allows the ship to be used primarily as a research vessel in addition to its role of resupplying the southernmost Antarctic base Belgrano II. The diesel engines have been replaced by four new ones purchased from MAN in October 2011. The main radar of Irízar was also repaired in Argentina by CITEDEF. Work was initially estimated to be finished by November 2011, but it was not until April 2017 that the icebreaker was declared seaworthy again.

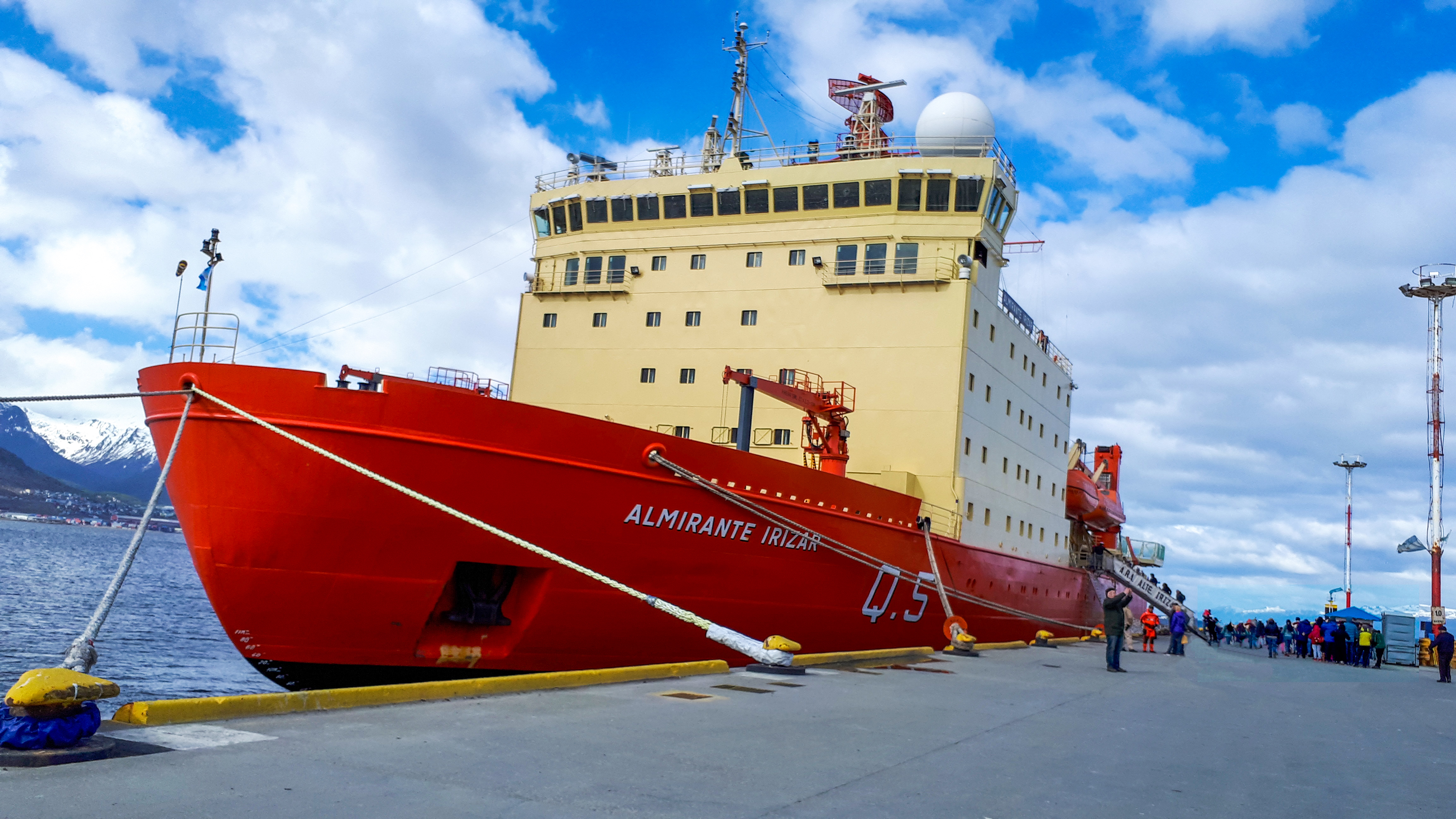
In the Ushuaia Port (2017)

On 4 July, Almirante Irízar sailed for open sea trials for the first time in ten years. After departing Buenos Aires, the vessel headed to a dry dock in the main base of Argentine Navy, Puerto Belgrano, where the icebreaker underwent tests and verifications prior to ice trials in the Antarctic and return to full service.

In November 2017, the ship came back to Buenos Aires after successfully passing its "ice test", the last stage of its restoration work that left it ready for service again. It was confirmed that it will be present on the Antarctic 2018 campaign. The ship remained active in the early 2020s and was joined by the auxiliary vessels Puerto Argentino and Estrecho San Carlos for operations during the 2022/23 Antarctic re-supply mission.

=== Second Antarctic vessel ===
In November 2014, the Argentine government awarded the design contact for the new Antarctic vessel to the Finnish engineering company Aker Arctic. After initial concept development, the project was put on hold until May 2022 when the design work again continued. The Polar Class 4 vessel intended to work alongside Almirante Irízar will be built by Tandanor in Argentina and enter service in the late 2020s.
