= ARA Bahía Buen Suceso =

1950–1982 transport ship

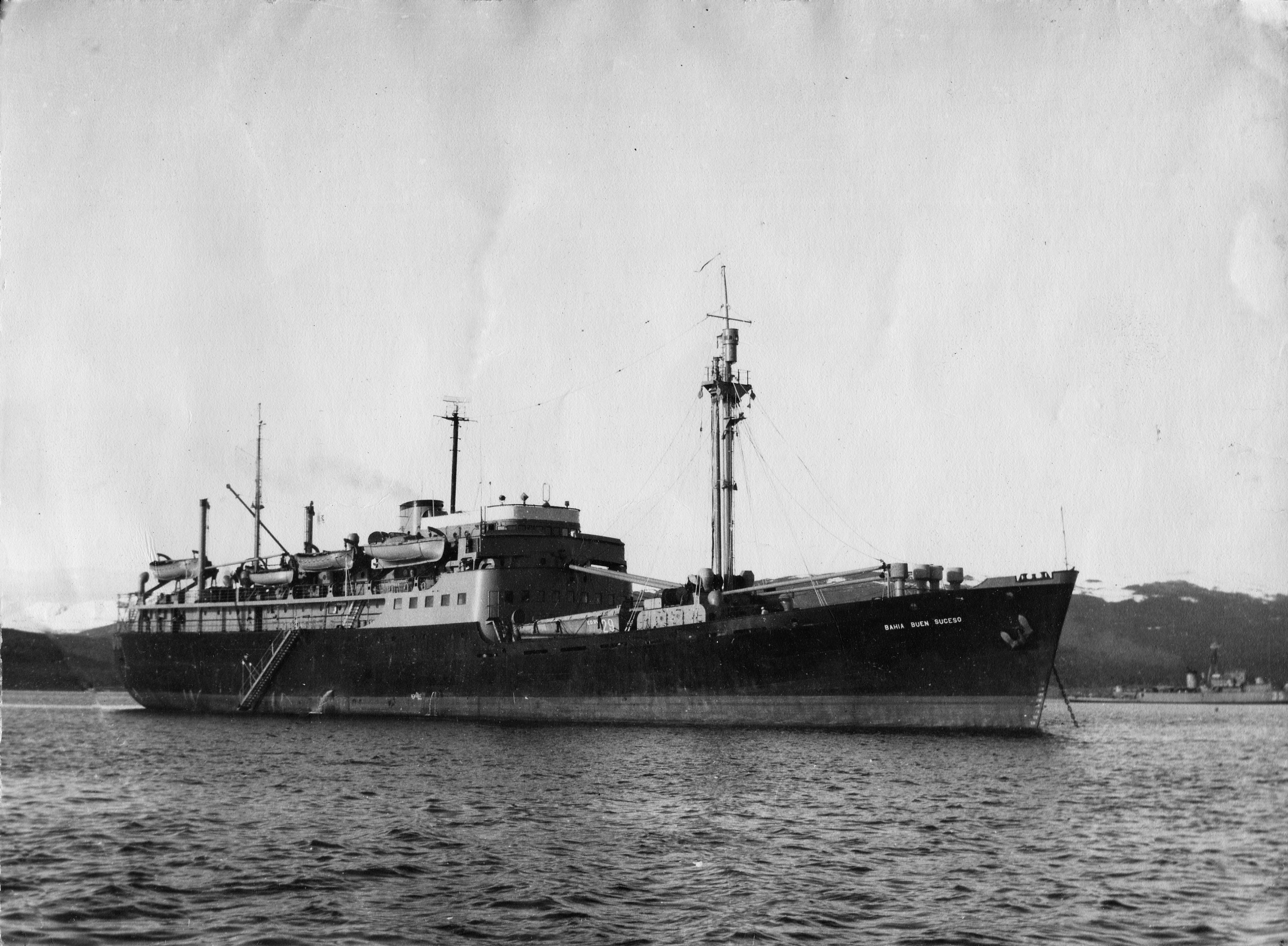

History

Argentina
- Name: Bahía Buen Suceso
- Builder: Halifax Shipbuilding Ltd., Halifax, Nova Scotia
- Yard number: 17
- Commissioned: 1950
- Identification: IMO number: 5033856; Call sign: LOPQ
- Fate: Sunk, 21 October 1982

General characteristics
- Class & type: Bahía Aguirre class
- Type: Transport
- Tonnage: 3,834 gross register tons (GRT)
- Length: 102.48 m (336 ft 3 in)
- Beam: 14.36 m (47 ft 1 in)
- Draught: 5.64 m (18 ft 6 in)
- Propulsion: 2 × Nordberg 5-cylinder 3,750 hp (2,796 kW) diesel engines, 2 shafts
- Speed: 14.5 knots (26.9 km/h; 16.7 mph)
- Capacity: 100 passengers
- Crew: 46

Service record
- Part of: Argentine Navy, Naval Transport Service
- Operations: Falklands War

ARA Bahía Buen Suceso (B-6) was a Bahía Aguirre-class 5,000-ton fleet transport that served in the Argentine Navy from 1950 to 1982. She took part in the Falklands War as a logistics ship tasked with resupplying the Argentine garrisons scattered around the Falkland Islands. Captured by British forces on 15 June after running aground at Fox Bay, she sank in deep waters while being used as target practice by the Royal Navy on 21 October 1982.

== History ==
The ship was constructed by Halifax Shipbuilding Limited at Halifax, Nova Scotia, Canada, and commissioned in June 1950 for service under the Transporte Navales command. In 1958 she carried the crew of the new aircraft carrier ARA Independencia to the United Kingdom. The vessel participated in numerous Antarctic supply missions. In October 1966, she transported the passengers, crew and hijackers of Aerolineas Argentinas DC-4 LV-AGG from the Falkland Islands to Ushuaia. The aircraft had been hijacked by a group of Argentine nationalists and flown to the islands three days earlier.

On 10 March 1969 she made a trip to Europe, visiting cities such as Genova, Bruges, Rotterdam, Amsterdam, Portsmouth, Edinburgh, and Dublin. The purpose of the trip was to carry wheat to Europe and bring military items to Argentina. While sailing through the English Channel, she collided with the tanker Asprella and was repaired at the Ferrol shipyard in Vigo, Spain.

Bahía Buen Suceso was often hired out to commercial companies, usually on coastal runs down to southern Argentina and also an annual summer tourist voyage to the Argentinian research bases in Antarctica. In 1972 she began regular service between the continent and the Falkland Islands.

=== Falklands War ===
The ship landed scrap-metal workers on South Georgia on 19 March 1982. Bahía Buen Suceso was one of the blockade runners during the Falklands War. She sailed from Stanley towards Falklands Sound on 29 April, before the first British attack. On 7 May, during a visual and radar surveillance mission while returning from Fox Bay, the ship spotted the schooner Penelope, property of the Falkland Islands Company, at anchor along a pier in Speedwell Island. The small craft was seized and searched some hours later by naval commandos and taken over by an Argentine prize crew the following day.

On 10 May 1982, while berthed in Fox Bay East on West Falkland, she was strafed by two Sea Harriers (XZ500 and ZA191) from HMS Hermes. As the ship was so close to a civilian settlement, the Harriers used their 30 mm cannons, damaging the ship's bridge and engine room, and setting on fire a paint store and workshop ashore. One of the Harriers was hit in the tail by a 7.62 mm round. Both aircraft returned safely to Hermes.

After the attack the ship remained moored in Fox Bay East. During a storm she tore partially free from her moorings and her bow swung onto the beach. After the war Bahía Buen Suceso was towed to San Carlos Water by the tug Irishman. There, she was repeatedly used for target practice by British warships and Sea Harriers of 809 NAS. On 21 October 1982 her hull was taken out to deep water, where it was sunk with three torpedoes by the submarine HMS Onyx.

== See also ==
- List of auxiliary ships of the Argentine Navy
