= Timeline of Malaysia Airlines Flight 370 =

The timeline of Malaysia Airlines Flight 370 (MAS370/MH370) lists events associated with the disappearance of Malaysia Airlines Flight 370—a scheduled, commercial flight operated by Malaysia Airlines from Kuala Lumpur International Airport to Beijing Capital International Airport on 8 March 2014 with 227 passengers and 12 crew. Air traffic control lost contact with Flight 370 less than an hour into the flight, after which it was tracked by military radar crossing the Malay Peninsula and was last located over the Andaman Sea. Analysis of automated communications between the aircraft and a satellite communications network has determined that the aircraft flew into the southern Indian Ocean, before communication ended shortly after 08:19 (UTC+8:00). The disappearance triggered a multinational search effort that later became the most expensive search operation in aviation history.

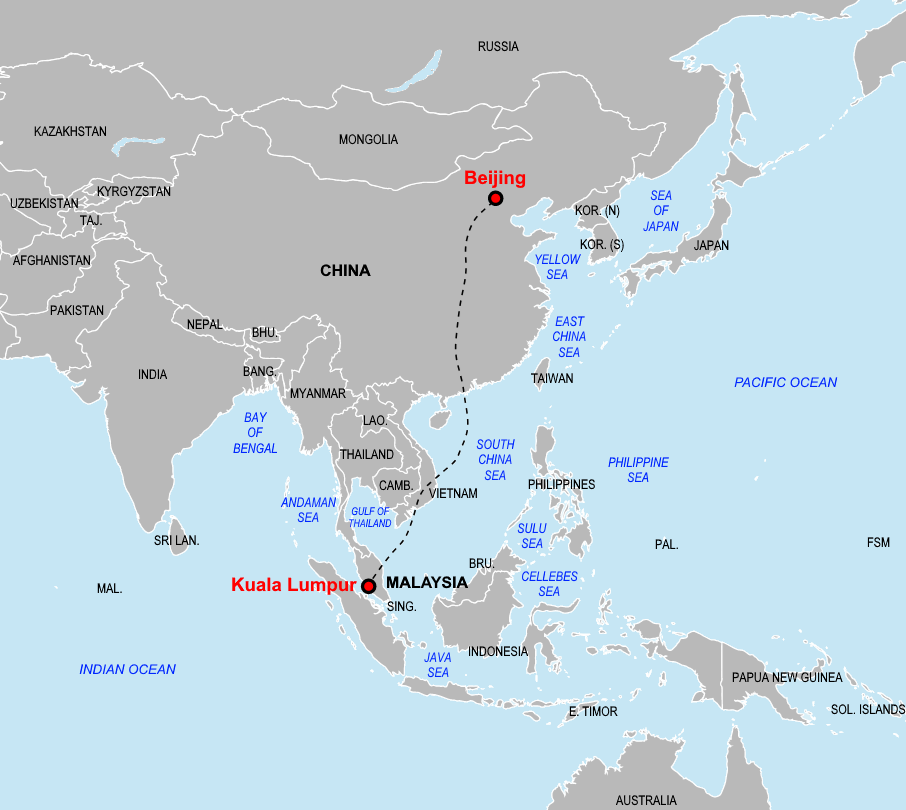
Map showing the scheduled flightpath and the surrounding region

Flight 370 last made voice contact with ATC at 01:19 MYT, 8 March (17:19 UTC, 7 March) when it was over the South China Sea, less than an hour after takeoff. It disappeared from ATC radar screens at 01:22 MYT, but was still tracked on military radar as it turned sharply away from its original northeastern course to head west and cross the Malay Peninsula, continuing that course until leaving the range of the military radar at 02:22 while over the Andaman Sea, 200 nautical miles (370 km; 230 mi) northwest of Penang Island, in northwestern Malaysia.

The multinational search effort for the aircraft, which was to become the most expensive aviation search in history, began in the Gulf of Thailand and the South China Sea, where the aircraft's signal was last detected on secondary surveillance radar, and was soon extended to the Strait of Malacca and Andaman Sea. Analysis of satellite communications between the aircraft and Inmarsat's satellite communications network concluded that the flight continued until at least 08:19 (nearly an hour after Malaysia Airlines publicly announced the aircraft's loss) and flew south into the southern Indian Ocean, although the precise location cannot be determined. Australia assumed charge of the search on 17 March, when the search effort began to emphasise the southern Indian Ocean. On 24 March, the Malaysian government noted that the final location determined by the satellite communication was far from any possible landing sites, and concluded, "Flight MH370 ended in the southern Indian Ocean."

From October 2016 to January 2017, a comprehensive survey of 120,000 km^{2} (46,000 mi^{2}) of sea floor about 1,800 km (1,100 mi; 970 nmi) southwest of Perth, Western Australia, yielded no evidence of the aircraft. Several pieces of marine debris found on the coast of Africa and on Indian Ocean islands off the coast of Africa—the first of which was discovered on 29 July 2015 on Réunion—have been confirmed as pieces of Flight 370. The bulk of the aircraft has not been located, prompting many theories about its disappearance.

In January 2018, a search by private US marine exploration company Ocean Infinity began in the search zone around 35.6°S 92.8°E, the most likely crash site according to the drift study published in 2017. In a previous search attempt, Malaysia had established a Joint Investigation Team (JIT) to investigate the incident, working with foreign aviation authorities and experts. Malaysia released a final report concerning Flight 370 on 17 October 2017. Neither the crew nor the aircraft's communication systems relayed a distress signal, indications of bad weather, or technical problems before the aircraft vanished.

Two Iranian passengers travelling on stolen passports were investigated but eliminated as suspects. Malaysian police identified the captain as the prime suspect if human intervention was the cause of the disappearance, after clearing all others on the flight of suspicion over possible motives. Power was lost to the aircraft's satellite data unit (SDU) at some point between 01:07 and 02:03; the SDU logged onto Inmarsat's satellite communication network at 02:25, which was three minutes after the aircraft had left the range of radar. Few circumstances can trigger a loss of power to the satellite, but this anomaly is a significant clue that there may have been an intermittent electrical problem on the airplane. Based on analysis of the satellite communications, the aircraft was postulated to have turned south after passing north of Sumatra and then to have flown for six hours with little deviation in its track, ending when its fuel was exhausted.

With the loss of all 239 lives on board, Flight 370 is the second-deadliest incident involving a Boeing 777 and the second-deadliest incident of Malaysia Airlines' history, second to Flight 17 in both categories. Malaysia Airlines was struggling financially, a problem that was exacerbated by a decrease of ticket sales after the disappearance of Flight 370 and the downing of Flight 17; the airline was renationalised by the end of 2014. The Malaysian government received significant criticism, especially from China, for failing to disclose information promptly during the early weeks of the search. According to documents cited in the book, The Crash Detectives, Malaysia Airlines knew more than a year before the loss of flight 370, that it was not meeting its own government's requirements or international standards for flight tracking. In April 2013, and again in June, several of the airline's auditors looking at the flight operations discovered a number of problems with the airline’s compliance. On Malaysia’s wide body long haul Boeing 747 and 777s, which would include the plane flying as MH-370, flights could only be tracked every half hour, even though they were required to know on a more frequent basis the whereabouts of each plane.

== Disappearance (8 March 2014) ==
Flight 370 took off from Kuala Lumpur International Airport at 00:42 local time (MYT; UTC+08:00) en route to Beijing Capital International Airport, where it was expected to arrive at 6:30 local time (CST; UTC+08:00). At 1:19, while Flight 370 was over the South China Sea between Malaysia and Vietnam, Malaysian air traffic control (ATC) instructed Flight 370 to contact the next ATC in Vietnam. The final voice contact from Flight 370 was made when its captain replied, "Good night. Malaysian Three Seven Zero". Two minutes later, the aircraft's transponder stopped functioning, causing it to disappear from ATC's secondary radar. Malaysian military radar continued to track the aircraft as it turned left, crossed the Malay Peninsula near the Malaysia–Thailand border, and travelled over the Andaman Sea.

At 2:22, the aircraft disappeared from Malaysian military radar, 200 nautical miles (370 km; 230 mi) north-west of Penang. At 2:25, the aircraft's satellite datalink, which was lost sometime between 01:07 and 02:03, was re-established. Thereafter, the aircraft's satellite data unit (SDU) replied to five hourly, automated status requests between 03:41 and 08:10, and two unanswered ground-to-aircraft telephone calls. At 08:19, the SDU sent a "log-on request" message to establish a satellite datalink, followed by the final transmission from Flight 370 eight seconds later. Investigators believe the 08:19 messages were made between the time of fuel exhaustion and the time the aircraft entered the ocean. After four hours of communication between several ATC centres, the Kuala Lumpur Aeronautical Rescue Coordination Centre was activated at 6:32. Malaysia Airlines released a press statement at 07:24, stating that contact with Flight 370 had been lost.

Elapsed (HH:MM)	Time		Event
Elapsed (HH:MM)	MYT	UTC	Event
1:52 prior	7 March		Captain Zaharie Ahmad Shah signs in for duty.
1:52 prior	22:50	14:50	Captain Zaharie Ahmad Shah signs in for duty.
1:28 prior	23:15	15:15	First Officer Fariq Abdul Hamid signs in for duty.
00:42 prior	8 March	16:00	The aircraft's SDU logs onto the Inmarsat satellite communication network.
00:42 prior	00:00	16:00	The aircraft's SDU logs onto the Inmarsat satellite communication network.
00:13 prior	00:27	16:27	ATC gives Flight 370 clearance to push back from the gate.
00:01:23 prior	00:40:37	16:40:37	ATC gives Flight 370 clearance to take off.
00:00	00:42	16:42	Flight 370 takes off from runway 32R at Kuala Lumpur International Airport.
00:01	00:42:53	16:42:53	ATC gives Flight 370 clearance to climb to Flight Level 180, approximately 18,000 ft (5,500 m) (Note: Aircraft altitude is given in feet above sea level and measured, at higher altitudes, by air pressure, which declines linearly as altitude above sea level increases. Using a standard sea level pressure and formula, the nominal altitude of a given air pressure can be determined—referred to as the "pressure altitude". A flight level is the pressure altitude measured in hundreds of feet. For example, flight level 350 corresponds to an altitude at which air pressure is 179 mmHg (23.9 kPa), which is nominally 35,000 ft (10,700 m) but does not indicate the true altitude.) and proceed directly to waypoint IGARI.
00:04	00:46:39	16:46:39	Flight 370 is transferred from the airport's ATC to Lumpur Radar ATC. Both the airport and Lumpur Radar ATC are based at the Kuala Lumpur Area Control Centre (KL ACC).
00:05	00:46:58	16:46:58	ATC gives Flight 370 clearance to climb to Flight Level 250; approximately 25,000 feet (7,600 metres).
00:08	00:50:08	16:50:08	ATC gives Flight 370 clearance to climb to Flight Level 350; approximately 35,000 feet (11,000 metres).
00:19	01:01:17	17:01:17	The captain (Note: Voice analysis of recordings between Flight 370 and ATC have determined that the first officer communicated with ATC while the aircraft was on the ground and the captain communicated with ATC after departure.) informs ATC that Flight 370 has reached Flight Level 350.
00:25	01:07:48	17:07:48	The final data transmission from Flight 370 using the ACARS protocol is made.
00:25–01:22	01:07:48–02:03:41	17:07:48–18:03:41	The satellite communication link is lost sometime during this period.
00:25	01:07:56	17:07:56	The captain confirms that Flight 370 is flying at Flight Level 350.
00:37	01:19:30	17:19:30	KL ACC instructs the crew to contact Ho Chi Minh ACC (HCM ACC). The aircraft passes waypoint IGARI as the captain replies, "Good night. Malaysian three seven zero." This is the final voice contact with Flight 370.
00:39	01:21:13	17:21:13	The position symbol of Flight 370 disappears from KL ACC radar, indicating the aircraft's transponder is no longer functioning. Malaysian military radar continues to track the aircraft, which "almost immediately" begins a turn to the left until it is travelling in a south-westerly direction.
00:48	01:30	17:30	Voice contact is attempted by another aircraft at the request of HCM ACC; mumbling and radio static are heard in reply.
00:55	01:37	17:37	An expected half-hourly ACARS data transmission is not received.
00:56	01:39	17:38	HCM ACC contacts KL ACC to inquire about Flight 370. HCM ACC says verbal contact was not established and Flight 370 disappeared from its radar screens near waypoint BITOD. KL ACC responds that Flight 370 did not return to its frequency after passing waypoint IGARI.
01:04	01:46	17:46	HCM ACC contacts KL ACC and informs them that radar contact with Flight 370 was established near IGARI, but lost near BITOD and that verbal contact was never established.
01:10	01:52	17:52	Flight 370 reached the southern end of Penang Island. First Officer Fariq Abdul Hamid's cellphone registered with a cell tower below, though no other data was transmitted. Flight 370 then turned towards northwest along the Strait of Malacca.
01:15	01:57	17:57	HCM ACC informs KL ACC there was no contact with Flight 370 despite attempts on many frequencies and aircraft in the vicinity.
01:21	02:03:41	18:03:41	Malaysia Airlines dispatch centre sends a message to the cockpit instructing pilots to contact Vietnam ATC, to which there is no response. A ground-to-aircraft ACARS data request, transmitted from the ground station multiple times between 02:03–02:05, was not acknowledged by the aircraft's satellite data unit.
01:21	02:03:48	18:03:48	KL ACC contacts HCM ACC and relays information from Malaysia Airlines' operations centre that Flight 370 is in Cambodian airspace.
01:33	02:15	18:15	KL ACC queries Malaysia Airlines' operations centre, which replies that it is able to exchange signals with Flight 370, which is in Cambodian airspace.
01:36	02:18	18:18	KL ACC contacts HCM ACC asking them whether Flight 370 was supposed to enter Cambodian airspace. HCM ACC replies that Flight 370's planned route did not take it into Cambodian airspace and that they had checked; Cambodia had no information about, or contact with, Flight 370.
01:40	02:22	18:22	The last primary radar contact is made by the Malaysian military, 200 nautical miles (370 km; 230 mi) north-west of Penang, 6°49′38″N 97°43′15″E
01:43	02:25	18:25	A "log-on request" is sent by the aircraft on its satellite communication link to the Inmarsat satellite communications network. The link is re-established after being lost for between 22 and 68 minutes. This communication is sometimes erroneously referred to as the first hourly "handshake" after the flight's disappearing from radar.
01:52	02:34	18:34	KL ACC queries Malaysia Airlines' operations centre about communication status with Flight 370, but it was not sure whether a message sent to Flight 370 was successful.
01:53	02:35	18:35	Malaysia Airlines' operations centre informs KL ACC that Flight 370 is in a normal condition based on signals from the aircraft located at 14°54′00″N 109°15′00″E (Northern Vietnam) at 18:33 UTC. KL ACC relays this information to HCM ACC.
01:57	02:39	18:39	A ground-to-aircraft telephone call, via the aircraft's satellite link, connects to the aircraft but goes unanswered.
02:01	02:43	18:43	It's reported that U.S. military personnel stationed in Thailand overheard an SOS signal from Flight 370, in which the pilot announced the imminent disintegration of the cabin and requested an emergency landing. This information was relayed to Malaysian authorities.
02:13	02:55	18:55	A "slight seismic event" is detected on the sea floor in the Gulf of Thailand, "possibly related" to Flight 370.
02:48	03:30	19:30	Malaysia Airlines' operations centre informs KL ACC that position information was based on flight projection and is not reliable for aircraft tracking. Between 03:30 and 04:25, KL and HCM ACCs query Chinese air traffic control.
02:59	03:41	19:41	Hourly, automated handshake between the aircraft and the Inmarsat satellite communication network.
03:59	04:41	20:41	Hourly, automated handshake between the aircraft and the Inmarsat satellite communication network.
04:27	05:09	21:09	Singapore ACC queried for information about Flight 370.
04:59	05:41	21:41	Hourly, automated handshake between the aircraft and the Inmarsat satellite communication network.
05:48	06:30	22:30	Flight 370 misses its scheduled arrival at Beijing Capital International Airport.
05:50	06:32	22:32	The Kuala Lumpur Aeronautical Rescue Coordination Centre (ARCC) is activated.
05:59	06:41	22:41	Hourly, automated handshake between the aircraft and the Inmarsat satellite communication network.
06:31	07:13	23:13	A ground-to-aircraft telephone call placed by Malaysia Airlines, via the aircraft's satellite link, connects to the aircraft but goes unanswered.
06:42	07:24	23:24	Malaysia Airlines issues a press statement announcing that Flight 370 is missing.
07:29	08:11	8 March	The last successful automated hourly handshake is made with the Inmarsat satellite communication network.
07:29	08:11	00:11	The last successful automated hourly handshake is made with the Inmarsat satellite communication network.
07:37	08:19:29	00:19:29	The aircraft sends a "log-on request" (sometimes referred to as a "partial handshake") to the satellite. Investigators believe this follows a power failure between the time the engines stopping due to fuel exhaustion and the emergency power generator starting.
07:37	08:19:37	00:19:37	Following a response from the ground station, the aircraft replies with a "log-on acknowledgement" message at 08:19:37.443. This is the final transmission received from Flight 370.
08:33	09:15	01:15	The aircraft does not respond to an hourly, automated handshake attempt.

Visualization of the time periods where MH370 was visible by RADAR and/or SATCOM.

== March 2014 ==
Initial search areas in Southeast Asia.

A search-and-rescue effort begins in Southeast Asia on the morning Flight 370 disappears. Two passengers who boarded with stolen passports raise suspicion in the days after the disappearance, but they were later determined to be asylum seekers. On 9 March, some search efforts are launched in the Andaman Sea at the request of Malaysian officials, based on the possibility that the aircraft may have turned back from its flight path; the following day, officials confirm Flight 370 turned back towards Malaysia.

On 15 March, Malaysian Prime Minister Najib Razak announced that Flight 370 had remained in contact with a satellite communication network for several hours after it disappeared and that the aircraft was last located by military radar over the Andaman Sea. Analysis of these communications indicate the last communication with the aircraft was made when it was along one of two corridors; one stretching northwest to Central Asia and one stretching southwest into the southern Indian Ocean. The northern corridor was soon discounted and a search of a remote region of the southern Indian Ocean, led by Australia, began on 18 March. On 24 March, Malaysia Airlines and Najib announced that the flight had ended in the Southern Indian Ocean without survivors.

Malaysia Airlines confirms that flight MH370 has lost contact with Subang Air Traffic Control at 2.40am, today (8 March 2014). Flight MH370, operated on the B777-200 aircraft, departed Kuala Lumpur at 12.41am on 8 March 2014. MH370 was expected to land in Beijing at 6.30am the same day. The flight was carrying a total number of 227 passengers (including 2 infants), 12 crew members. Malaysia Airlines is currently working with the authorities who have activated their Search and Rescue team to locate the aircraft.

— First press release from Malaysia Airlines, 7:24 8 March (UTC+8)

8 March
At 5:30, the Aeronautical Rescue Coordination Centre (ARCC) at the Kuala Lumpur Area Control Center is activated. A search-and-rescue effort is initiated in the South China Sea and Gulf of Thailand around the location at which Flight 370 lost contact with air traffic control.

At 7:24, Malaysia Airlines issues a press statement saying contact with Flight 370 had been lost at 2:40—later changed to 1:30—and that a search and rescue effort had been initiated. After contacting the passengers' and crew's families, the passenger manifest is released.

In the morning, after the announcement of Flight 370s disappearance, the Royal Malaysian Air Force reviews data collected by military radar. They find that an unidentified aircraft, later determined to be Flight 370, had crossed the Malay Peninsula and was tracked until it left their radar's range at 2:22 while over the Andaman Sea. The satellite communications are not noticed until the following day and are not publicly disclosed for several days, while the radar data is not immediately acknowledged.

Austria and Italy confirm that two people listed on the passenger manifest—one from each country—were not on the flight. Both men's passports had been stolen in Thailand within the last two years.

The US National Transportation Safety Board sends a team of investigators to Malaysia.

Inmarsat hands over its data regarding communications with Flight 370 in response to a request from SITA, the company providing the datalink for Flight 370's communications equipment.

9 March
By the end of the day, 40 aircraft and more than 24 vessels from several nations are involved in the search. Thailand's navy shifts the focus of its search to the Andaman Sea at the request of Malaysia. The Chief General of the Royal Malaysian Air Force announces that Malaysia is focused on a recording of radar and there is a "possibility" that Flight 370 turned around and travelled over the Andaman Sea.

Malaysia Airlines sends a team of more than 150 senior managers and caregivers to Beijing (most passengers were from China), where a centre is established for families of those on board to be comforted and await the latest news from the airline. A similar centre is opened in Kuala Lumpur. Malaysia Airlines also announces they are beginning to provide financial assistance to the families of those on board and are offering to transport them to Kuala Lumpur.

INTERPOL confirms the passports of the Austrian and Italian men were registered in its database of stolen passports and that no query of the database was made. Officials investigate CCTV video of these passengers taken before they boarded the flight. There are concerns about a possible link to terrorism, but officials say no such links have been found.

9–11 March
Staff at Inmarsat look at the data they received from Flight 370 to determine whether they can assist the search. They find the aircraft continued flying for several hours after it lost contact with air traffic control and analyse it to determine the aircraft's location. By the morning of 11 March, they determine the aircraft was last located along one of two arcs and share the information with Malaysian investigators.

10 March
The Royal Malaysian Air Force confirms Flight 370 made a "turn back".

11 March
Malaysian police announce the two passengers using stolen passports were Iranian men who were likely migrants trying to emigrate to Germany. The tickets for both passengers ended in Frankfurt. The head of INTERPOL says, "the more information we get, the more we are inclined to conclude it is not a terrorist incident".

China activates the International Charter on Space and Major Disasters to aggregate satellite data to aid the search.

Inmarsat provides Malaysia with an initial analysis of the communications with Flight 370. Malaysia discusses the information with US investigators and agrees to allow the US to investigate the Inmarsat data. New Scientist publishes an article saying Flight 370 "sent at least two bursts of technical data back to the airline before it disappeared".

12 March
Malaysian officials announce an unidentified aircraft, possibly Flight 370, was last located by military radar at 2:15 in the Andaman Sea, 320 kilometres (200 mi) north-west of Penang Island and near the limits of the military radar's coverage.

13 March
An article published by the Wall Street Journal says Flight 370 continued to fly for hours after it was last seen by air traffic control, citing undisclosed US investigators. The article originally states that messages about engine performance continued to be sent to engine manufacturer Rolls-Royce; the newspaper soon corrects the article to say the claim is "based on analysis of signals sent by the Boeing 777's satellite-communication link ... the link operated in a kind of standby mode and sought to establish contact with a satellite or satellites. These transmissions did not include data." Malaysia denies the report.

Speaking at a press conference, White House spokesman Jay Carney says, "It is my understanding that based on some new information that's not necessarily conclusive—but new information—an additional search area may be opened in the Indian Ocean".

China criticizes Malaysia's handling of the search coordination and the flow of information.

14 March
Inmarsat publicly acknowledges they recorded transmissions from the aircraft for several hours after it disappeared from air traffic control over the South China Sea.

Malaysia Airlines retires the MH370/MH371 flight number pair and begins using MH318/MH319.

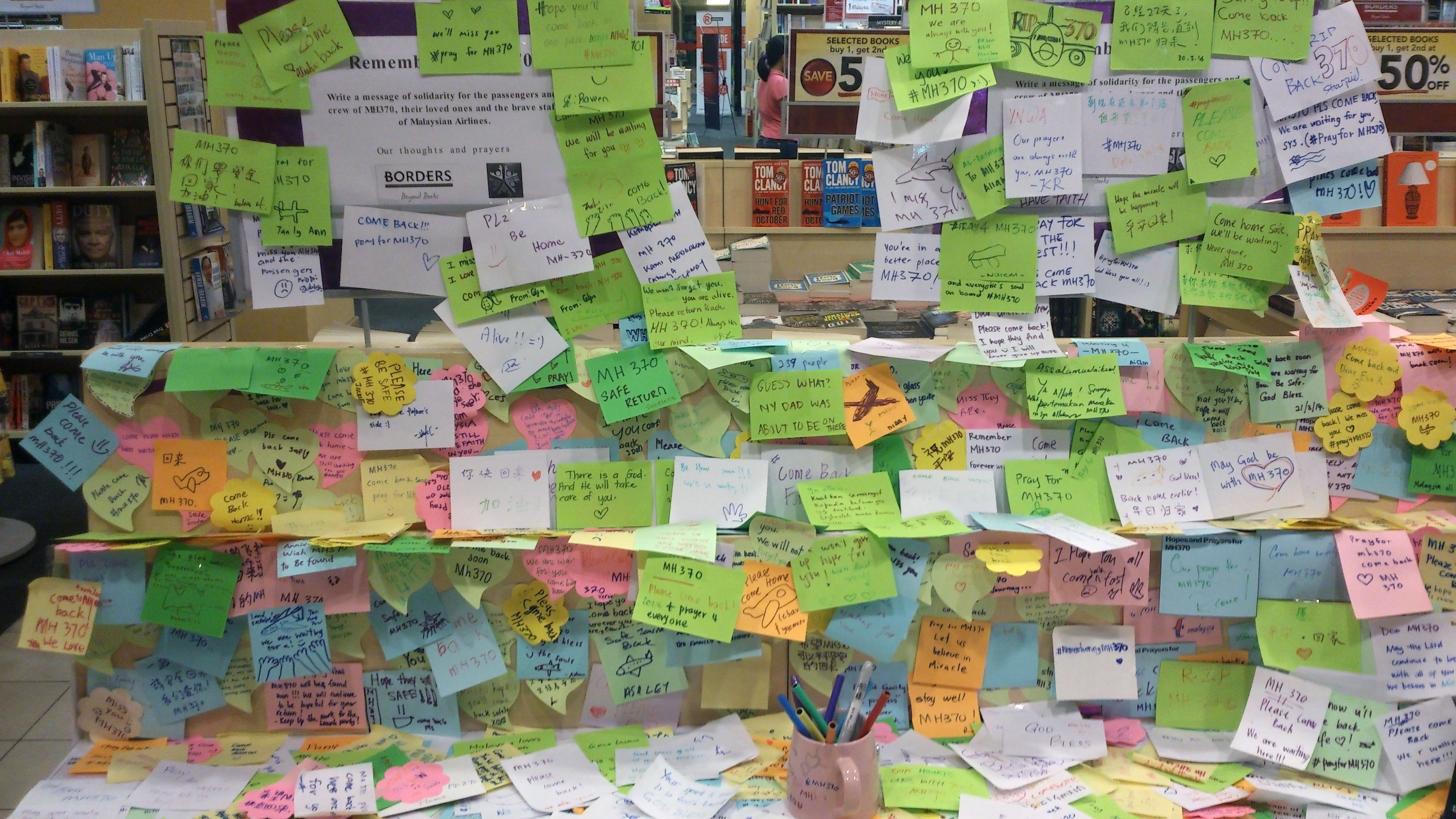
Messages of hope and prayer for Flight 370 at a bookstore in Malaysia

15 March
In a press conference, Malaysian PM Najib confirms Flight 370 remained in contact with Inmarsat's satellite communication network for several hours after it was lost by air traffic control. He says the ACARS messaging system was disabled early in the flight but the final satellite communication was made at 8:11. The final communication was made along one of two arcs; a "northern corridor" stretching from northern Thailand to Kazakhstan and a "southern corridor" from Indonesia into the southern Indian Ocean. Najib says the search in the South China Sea will be ended and the deployment of assets re-assessed. Malaysia sends diplomatic notes to all of the countries along the two corridors.

A team from Inmarsat arrives in Malaysia to assist in the investigation, which involves Malaysia, the US and the UK.

Investigators visit the homes of both pilots. A flight simulator in the home of Captain Shah is confiscated. Malaysian police chief Khalid Abu Bakar says it was the first visit to the pilots' homes but officials later say they visited the pilots' homes on 9 March.

17 March
Australia agrees to lead the search along the southern corridor in the southern Indian Ocean, which mostly lies within Australia's concurrent aeronautical and maritime search and rescue regions. A shipping broadcast requesting assistance in the search is made.

18 March
Australia conducts its first aerial search of the southern Indian Ocean, 2,500 kilometres (1,600 mi) south-west of Perth. The search area was determined by the US National Transportation Safety Board and is approximately 600,000 square kilometres (230,000 sq mi) in size.

19 March
The search area is revised to approximately 305,000 km^{2} (118,000 sq mi) about 2,600 kilometres (1,600 mi) south-west of Perth. Three merchant ships have joined the search.

20 March
Australian Prime Minister Tony Abbott announces that satellite imagery taken on 16 March appears to show two large objects floating in the ocean 2,500 km (1,600 mi) south-west of Perth. The images, taken by Digital Globe and analysed by the Defence Imagery and Geospatial Organisation, show objects that appear to be 24 m (79 ft) and 5 m (16 ft) in length at 44°03′02″S 91°13′27″E.

Aircraft are dispatched to the area of the satellite images but do not find the objects. HMAS Success and a merchant vessel are en route to the area, joining a merchant vessel already there. Six merchant vessels have assisted in the search since a shipping broadcast was made on 17 March.

22 March
Officials announce that images captured by a Chinese satellite on 18 March shows a possible object measuring 22.5 by 13 metres (74 by 43 ft) at 44°57′29″S 90°13′43″E, approximately 3,170 kilometres (1,970 mi) west of Perth and 120 kilometres (75 mi) from the earlier sighting.

Using a type of analysis never before used in an investigation of this sort...Inmarsat and the AAIB have concluded that MH370 flew along the southern corridor, and that its last position was in the middle of the Indian Ocean, west of Perth. This is a remote location, far from any possible landing sites. It is therefore with deep sadness and regret that I must inform you that, according to this new data, Flight MH370 ended in the southern Indian Ocean.

— Prime Minister of Malaysia Najib Razak

24 March
Malaysia's Prime Minister Najib Razak announces at a press conference at 22:00 local time (Malaysia) that Flight 370 is presumed to have gone down in the southern Indian Ocean with no survivors. Shortly before Najib's announcement, Malaysia Airlines tells families it assumes "beyond reasonable doubt" there are no survivors.

The search area is narrowed to the southern part of the Indian Ocean to the west and south-west of Australia. The northern search corridor north-west of Malaysia and the northern half of the southern search corridor—the waters between Indonesia and Australia—are definitively ruled out. An Australian search aircraft spots an "orange rectangular object" and a "gray or green circular object" 2,490 km (1,550 mi) south-west of Perth.

25 March
Around 200 relatives of Flight 370 passengers protest outside the Malaysian embassy in Beijing; a rare event in China. Among the angry, distraught relatives' chants are "Liars!" and "Tell the truth! Return our relatives!" China demands Malaysia hand over the satellite data that led them to determine that Flight 370 ended in the southern Indian Ocean with no survivors. China sends a special envoy to Malaysia.

26 March
Officials announce that images captured by a French satellite on 23 March appear to show about 122 floating objects up to 23 m (75 ft) in length at 44°41′24″S 90°25′19.20″E, 44°41′38.45″S 90°29′31.20″E and 44°40′10.20″S 90°36′25.20″E, which is about 930 km (580 mi) north of the earlier satellite observations.

The UK Air Accidents Investigation Branch (AAIB) announces they have appointed an accredited representative to join the investigation team in Malaysia. As the state of manufacture of the aircraft's engines (UK manufacturer Rolls-Royce), the AAIB is authorized to join the investigation by ICAO protocol.

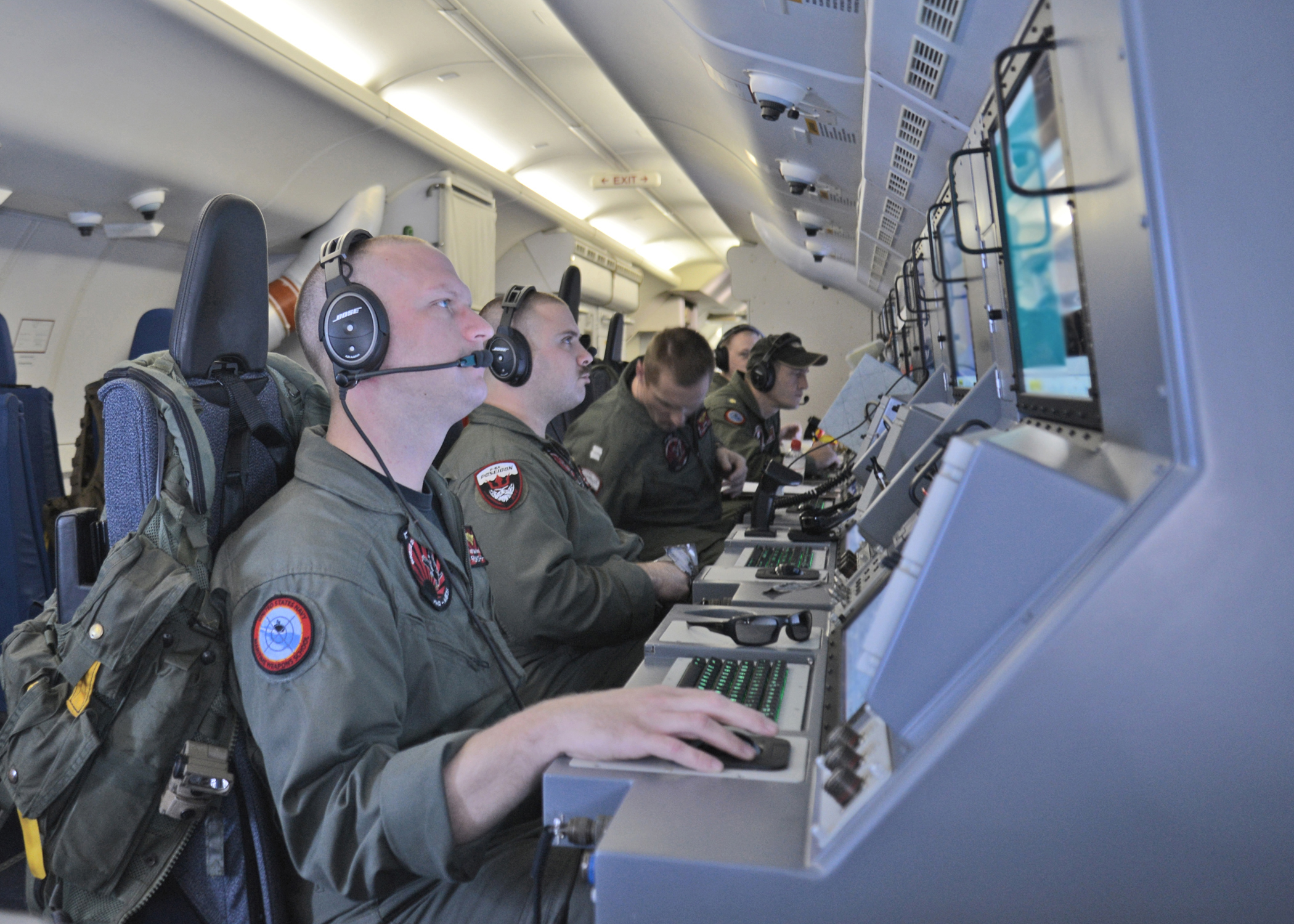
Crew members operate terminals on board a US Navy P-8A Poseidon searching for surface debris and locator beacons from Flight 370 in the southern Indian Ocean.

27 March
Officials reveal that images captured by a Thai satellite on 24 March appear to show about 300 floating objects 2–15 m (6 ft 7 in – 49 ft 3 in) in size. The possible objects are about 2,700 km (1,700 mi) south-west of Perth and about 200 kilometres (120 mi) south of the French observations.

28 March
The search shifts to a new 319,000-square-kilometre (123,000 sq mi) area around 1,100 kilometres (680 mi) north-east of the previous search area.

29 March
Malaysia announces that an international panel will be formed to investigate the Flight 370 incident.

30 March
The Joint Agency Coordination Centre (JACC), headed by Angus Houston, is established to coordinate the search effort. It becomes operational the following day and assumes the role of coordinating the search effort and communicating with media, foreign governments, and between Australian government agencies from the Australian Maritime Safety Authority (AMSA).

== April – May 2014 ==
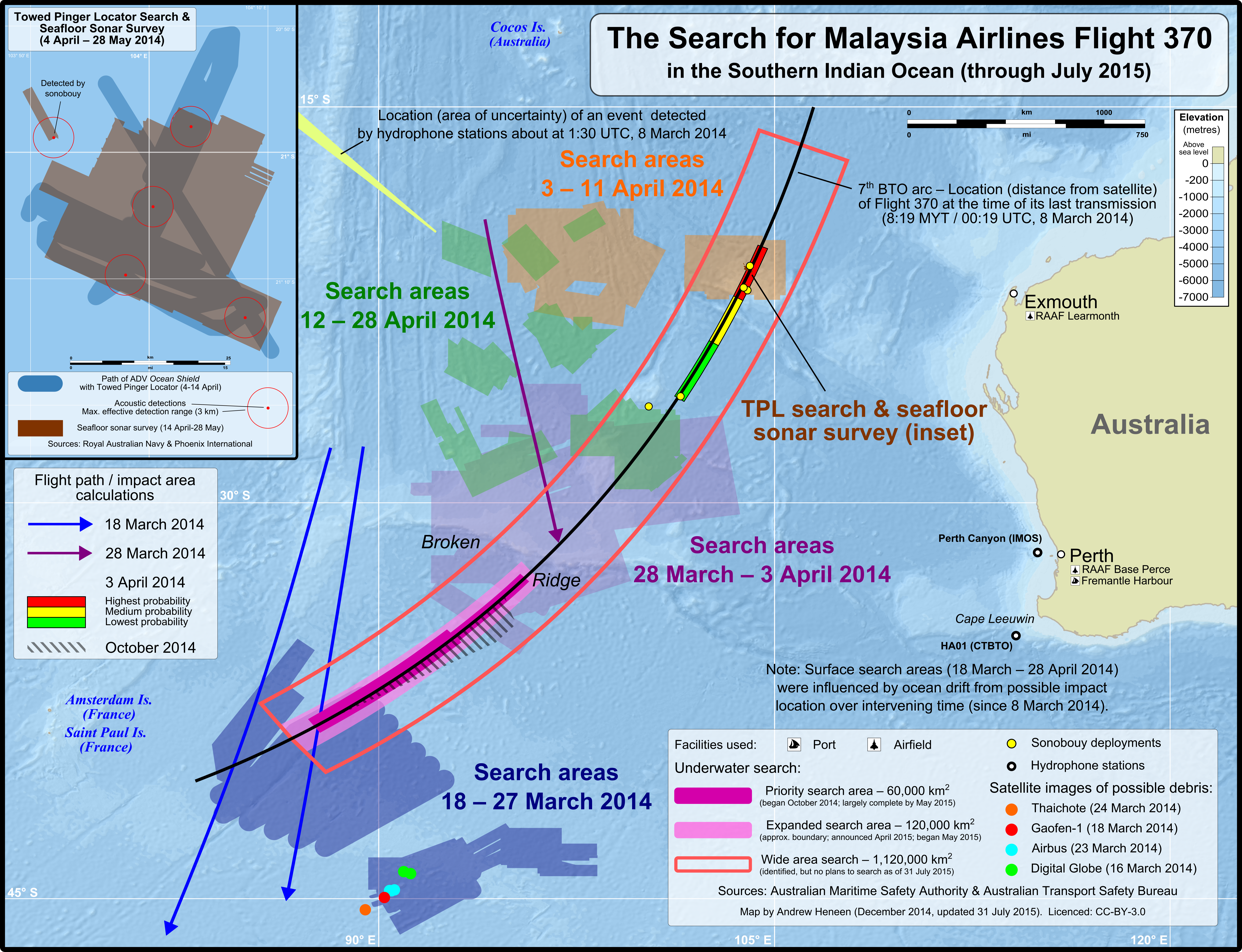
Search efforts in the Southern Indian Ocean.

In early April, an intense effort—the "acoustic search"— was made to detect the acoustic signals generated by underwater locator beacons (ULBs, also known as "pingers") attached to the flight recorders on Flight 370. After immersion in water, the ULBs emit an acoustic signal (also called a "ping") at a specific frequency once per second and have a battery life of 30–40 days. Three vessels, including one submarine and a vessel employing a towed pinger locator, tried to detect the acoustic signal along the 7th BTO arc—the centreline of the southern corridor—until 14 April, detecting several possible pings. Analysis of these signals determined they did not match the nominal characteristics of the ULBs; although unlikely, experts determine they may have originated from a damaged ULB. A sonar search of the seafloor begins on 14 April. A search of the ocean surface by aircraft and vessels ends on 28 April and the sonar search—the seafloor sonar survey—ends on 28 May, finding no debris from Flight 370. In late May, work on a bathymetric survey begins in preparation for the next phase of the search.

In early April, Malaysia submits a preliminary report to the ICAO, which is publicly released on 1 May along with recordings of conversations between Flight 370 and air traffic control. On 27 May, the complete log of transmissions between Flight 370 and Inmarsat via satellite are released, following weeks of public pressure.

1 April
The International Air Transport Association (IATA), a major industry trade group, announces it will form a task group to enhance aircraft tracking to ensure further aircraft disappearances cannot happen.

2 April
The Royal Navy survey vessel HMS Echo makes a possible ULB detection. After tests the following day, the detection is determined to be an artefact of the ship's sonar system.

Deployment of a towed pinger locator to search for an aircraft's ULBs.

4 April
Chinese patrol ship Haixun 01 makes a possible ULB detection.

The ADV Ocean Shield deploys the first of its two towed pinger locators (TPLs).

5 April
Haixun 01 makes another possible ULB detection about 3 km (1.9 mi) west of the previous day's detection and near 25°S 101°E. Neither detection was recorded. HMS Echo and a submarine were later tasked to the location of the Haixun 01's detections, but unable to make any detections. It was determined the depth of the seafloor, surface noise and the equipment used by Haixun 01 made it unlikely the detections were from ULBs.

The ADV Ocean Shield deploys its second TPL, after the first exhibited problematic acoustic noise. Two detections are made. (Note: The 5 April detections by the ADV Ocean Shield were made at 4:45 and 9:27PM.) The first detection, made while the TPL was descending, lasted over two hours before it was lost. This detection was made at 33 kHz, while the ULBs on Flight 370's flight recorders emit a pulse at 37.5±1kHz. When the vessel passed the location in the opposite direction, a second detection lasting 13 minutes was made. Houston calls this the "most promising lead" thus far in the search.

Malaysia reorganizes its investigation team to consist of an airworthiness group, an operations group, and a medical and human factors group. The airworthiness group will examine issues related to maintenance records, structures and aircraft systems. The operations group will review flight recorders, operations and meteorology. The medical and human factors group will investigate psychological, pathological and survival factors. Malaysia also announces it has set up three ministerial committees—a Next of Kin Committee, a committee to organise a Joint Investigation Team, and a committee responsible for Malaysian assets deployed in the search effort.

6 April
It has now been 30 days since Flight 370 presumably crashed in the southern Indian Ocean; the minimum battery life of the ULBs on Flight 370's flight recorders. The manufacturer of the ULBs predicts the maximum battery life is about 40 days.

6–16 April
Sorties flown by Royal Australian Air Force AP-3C Orion aircraft deploy sonobuoys in locations near the 7th BTO arc where water depths are favourable for detection by sonobuoy. Sonobuoys float on the surface and release a hydrophone that descends 300 m (1,000 ft) and can detect ULB signals up to 4,000 m (13,000 ft) below the surface. Each sortie can deploy up to 84 sonobuoys capable of searching around 3,000 km^{2} (1,200 sq mi). A possible ULB detection is made on 10 April with a sonobuoy close to the location of the ADV Ocean Shield; this is quickly determined to be unrelated to Flight 370's ULBs.

8 April
ADV Ocean Shield makes two possible ULB detections, close to those of 5 April, lasting about five and a half minutes and seven minutes. (Note: The 8 April detections by the ADV Ocean Shield were made at 4:27PM and 10:17PM.) The following day, Houston says the acoustic search will continue for as long as feasible because more and better quality detections will better pinpoint the aircraft's location—if indeed the detections were from Flight 370's ULBs. He also says the batteries will expire soon and the TPL can search six times more seafloor per day than the autonomous underwater vehicle carried aboard ADV Ocean Shield.

9 April
Malaysia submits a five-page preliminary report to the International Civil Aviation Organization, the United Nations' civil aviation body. The report, dated 9 April but not publicly released until 1 May, includes a call for better tracking technology for commercial aircraft.

10 April
A sonobuoy deployed near ADV Ocean Shield makes a possible ULB detection. The following day, officials say the detection is unlikely to be related to Flight 370.

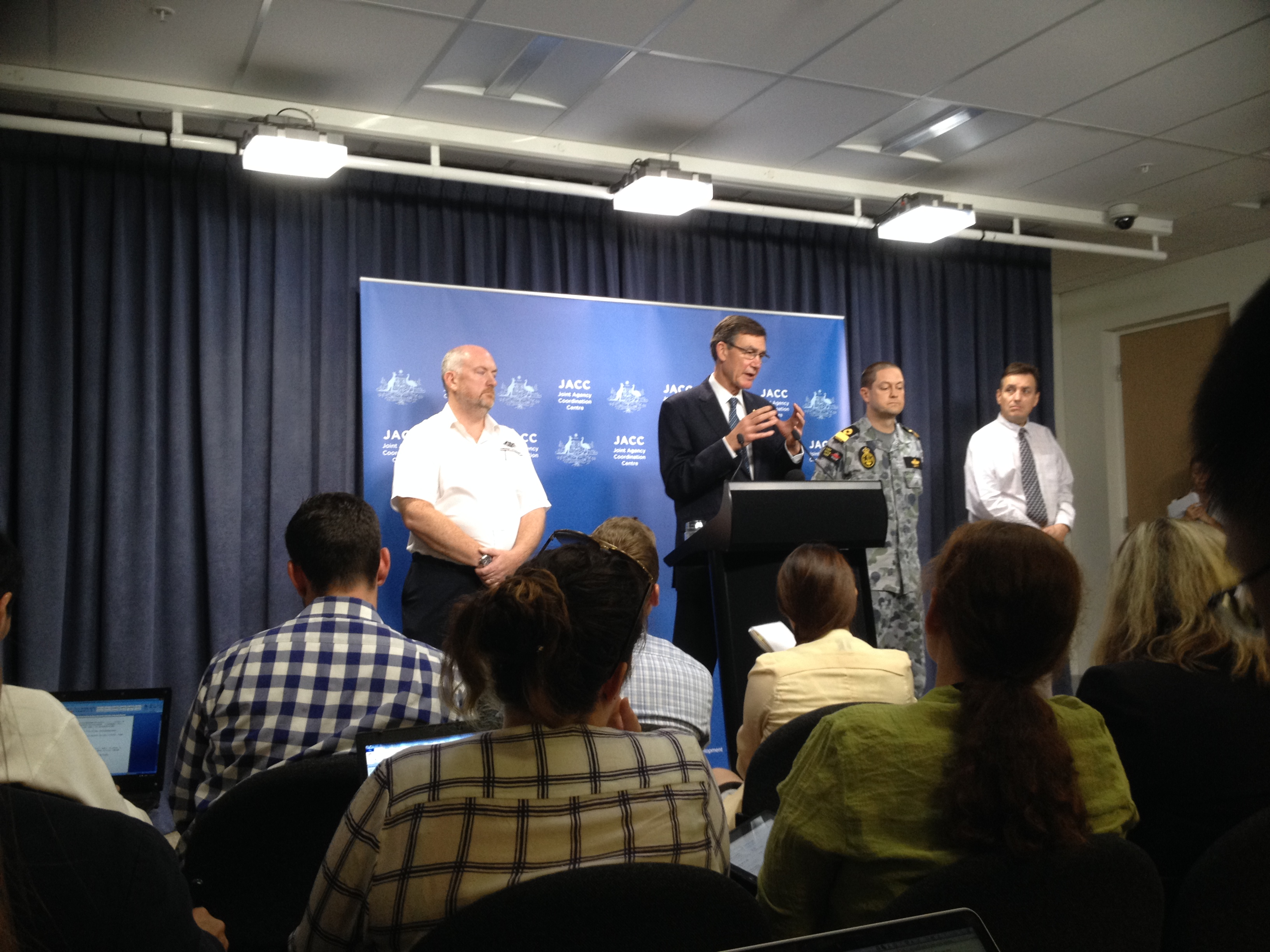
JACC Director Angus Houston speaks at a press briefing on 14 April.

13 April
An oil slick is found 5.5 km (3.4 mi) from possible ULB detections made by the ADV Ocean Shield. On 17 April, the JACC announces that tests of samples from the oil slick detected neither jet fuel nor hydraulic fluid.

14 April
The ULBs have now been underwater for 38 days. Considering their batteries last 30–40 days and that no possible detections have been made in almost a week, ADV Ocean Shield stops searching with the TPL and deploys a Bluefin-21, a torpedo-shaped autonomous underwater vehicle equipped with side-scan sonar, to scan the seafloor in the vicinity of the possible ULB detections. Analysis of the detections by the ADV Ocean Shield determine they do not match the nominal characteristics of the ULBs. Experts determine that although unlikely, they may have originated from a damaged ULB. The decision is made to search the seafloor in the vicinity of the detections (near 21°S 104°E). During this new phase of the search—the seafloor sonar survey— the Bluefin-21 will be deployed with a programmed area to scan. Each mission scans about 40 km^{2} (15 sq mi) of seafloor and takes about 24 hours; two hours to descend, 16 hours spent scanning the seafloor and two hours to return to the surface. Once back at the surface, it is recovered. It takes about four hours to change the batteries and download data from the mission, which is analysed aboard the ADV Ocean Shield. The first mission ends prematurely when the Bluefin-21 reached its maximum operating depth; it needs to be about 50 m (160 ft) above the seafloor to obtain a reliable image.

23 April
A metal object, appearing to be a piece of riveted sheet metal, washes up on the Western Australian coast, 10 km (6.2 mi) east of Augusta. The next day the ATSB determines that the object is unrelated to Flight 370.

28 April
The surface search ends. In a press conference, Australian Prime Minister Tony Abbott says any debris would likely have become waterlogged and sunk and that the aircraft involved in the surface search were "operating at close to the limit of sensible and safe operation". The surface search in Southeast Asia and the Indian Ocean lasted 52 days, during 41 of which Australia coordinated the search. Over 4,500,000 km^{2} (1,700,000 sq mi) of ocean surface was searched. In the Southern Indian Ocean, 29 aircraft from seven countries conducted 334 search flights; 14 ships from several countries were also involved. Although the seafloor sonar survey will continue, Abbott says plans for the next phase of the search, which will involve commercial companies and use towed sonar to more easily scan large areas of seafloor, are being developed.

1 May
The interim report submitted earlier by Malaysia to the ICAO, dated 9 April, is released publicly, along with Flight 370's cargo manifest and seating plan, audio recordings and a transcript of communications between Flight 370 and Malaysian air traffic control.

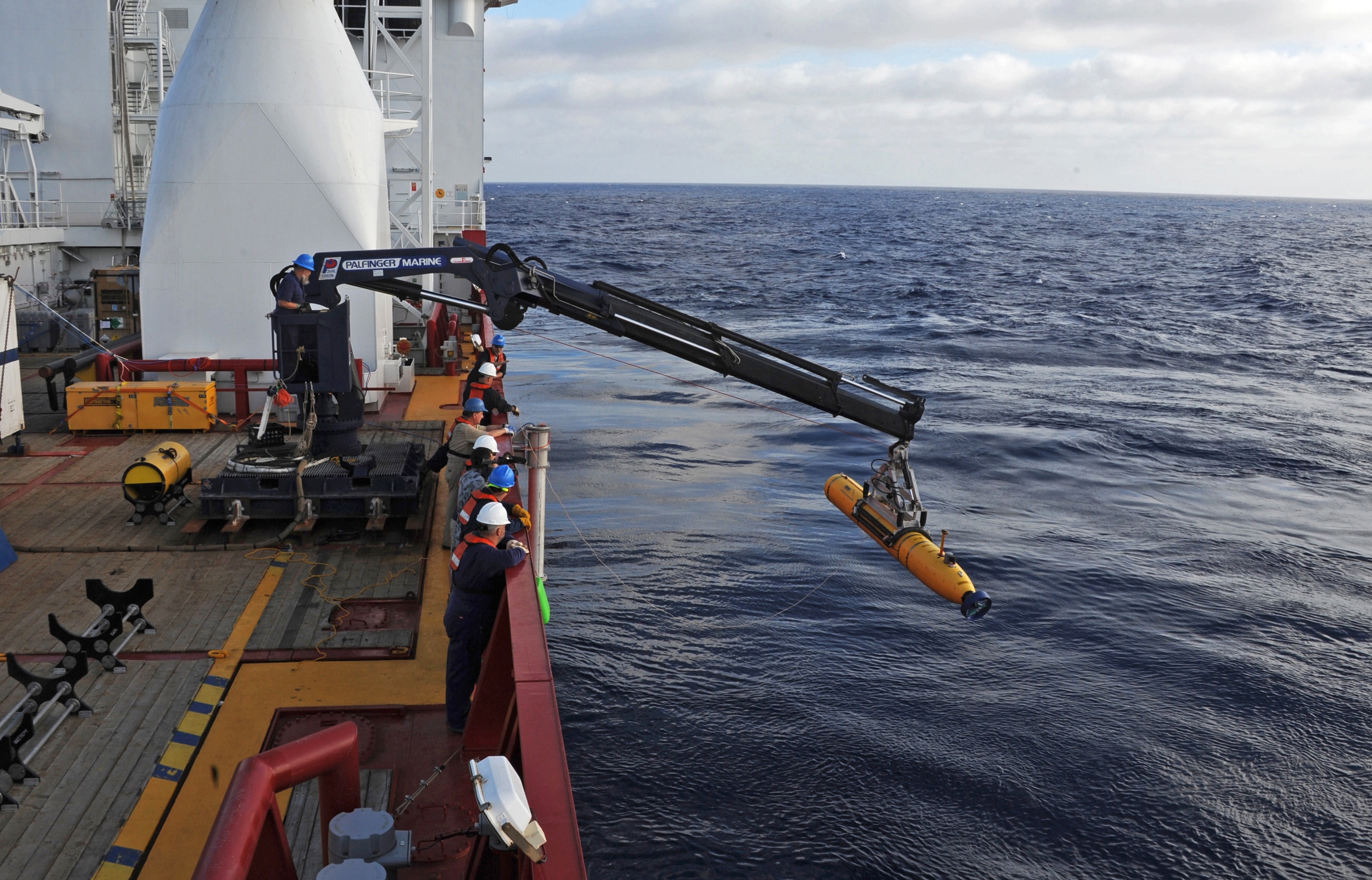
ADV Ocean Shield deploys Bluefin-21, 14 April 2014.

2–22 May
The seafloor sonar survey is suspended on 2 May as the AVD Ocean Shield returns to port to replenish supplies and personnel. Within two hours of its first deployment after returning to the search area on 13 May, Bluefin-21 develops a communications problem and is recovered. Spare parts from the UK were required and the AVD Ocean Shield returned to port to collect the parts. The problem is fixed and the seafloor sonar survey resumes on 22 May.

5 May
A tripartite meeting to discuss the next phase of the search is held with representatives from Australia (Warren Truss, Minister for Infrastructure and Regional Development), Malaysia (Hishammuddin Hussein, Defence Minister and acting Transport Minister), and China (Yang Chuantang, Transport Minister). During the press conference, Truss announces the US Navy has extended the contract for Bluefin-21 by four weeks.

13 May
The Wall Street Journal publishes a commentary by Malaysian PM Najib, who defends Malaysia's response to the disappearance of Flight 370 and acknowledges his government "didn't get everything right".

21 May
The Chinese vessel Zhu Kezhen leaves Fremantle to begin conducting the bathymetric survey. Because available bathymetric data for the area is of poor resolution, the survey is necessary for the safe operation of towed equipment that will be used during the next phase of the search.

27 May
Malaysia releases the complete log of transmissions between Flight 370 and Inmarsat via satellite after weeks of public pressure.

28 May
The seafloor sonar survey is completed. After 30 deployments of the Bluefin-21 to depths of 3,000–5,000 m (9,800–16,400 ft), which scanned 860 km^{2} (330 sq mi) of seabed, no objects associated with Flight 370 were found. The following day, after analysis of data from the last mission, the ATSB announces the search in the vicinity of the acoustic detections is complete and the area can be discounted as the final location of Flight 370.

== June – September 2014 ==
During this time, preparations are made for the next phase of the search, which was initially scheduled to begin in August, but did not commence until early October. On 26 June, Australia announces details for the next phase of the search—named the "underwater search"—despite the previous underwater towed pinger locator search and sonar survey. A bathymetric survey, begun in May, is necessary to map the seafloor topography before the underwater search. On 6 August, Australia awards a A$50 million tender to conduct the underwater search to Fugro; Malaysia is also contributing assets to the underwater search.

Suspect acoustic detection
Audio recording which may be the crash of Flight 370 into the ocean, sped up by a factor of 10 to be discernible.

4 June
A recording of an underwater sound that could have been that of Flight 370 hitting the water is released by researchers from Curtin University. The researchers believe the sound is probably unrelated to Flight 370. The lead researcher believes there is a small chance—perhaps 10 percent—that the acoustic event is related to Flight 370.

Australia opens the tender process for the underwater search. Bidders may submit proposals until 30 June.

10 June
The ATSB hires Fugro, which will use the MV Fugro Equator, which will conduct the bathymetric survey alongside the Zhu Kezhen.

12 June
The head of the Malaysian government committee to handle the needs of families of Flight 370 passengers announces that families of missing passengers will receive US$50,000 per person as an interim compensation.

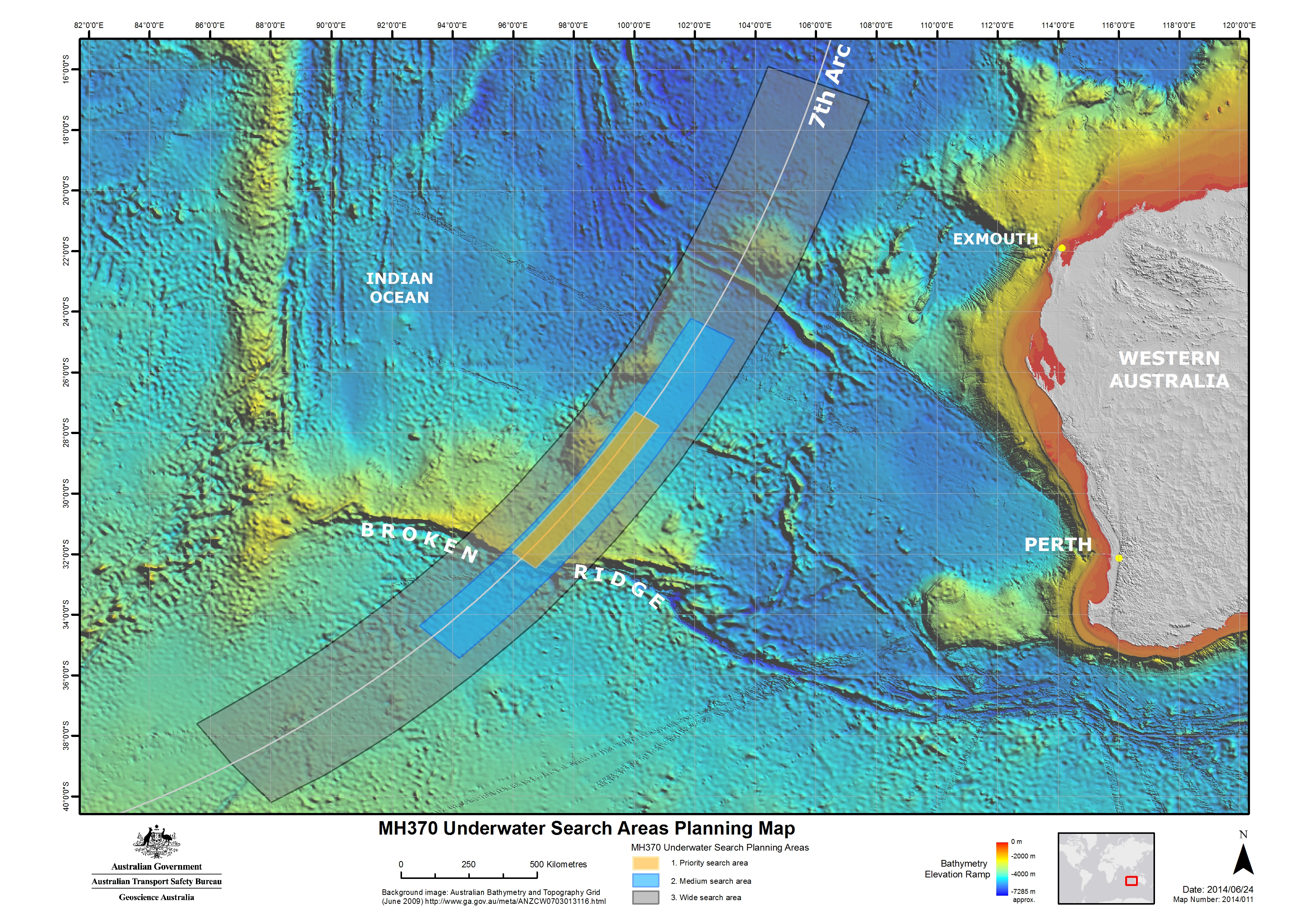
Search areas identified in the ATSB report released 26 June. The priority areas were later adjusted in October, based on further analysis of the satellite communications.

26 June
The ATSB releases a report, MH370 – Definition of Underwater Search Areas, discussing the methodology used to determine a new search area along the 7th BTO arc determined by the aircraft's communication with the Inmarsat satellite. The search will prioritise an area of approximately 60,000 km^{2} (23,000 sq mi). A bathymetric survey of the region, already underway, will take around three months to complete. The new underwater search is expected to begin in August. Australia and Malaysia are working on a Memorandum of Understanding to cover financial and co-operation arrangements for search and recovery activities. Among other details, the ATSB report concludes an unresponsive crew or hypoxia event "best fit the available evidence" for the five-hour period of the flight as it travelled south over the Indian Ocean, likely on autopilot.

17 July
Malaysia Airlines Flight 17 is shot down in a rebel-controlled area of Ukraine. Malaysia's Defence Minister assures the public that the additional incident will not detract from Malaysia's commitment to the search for Flight 370.

21 July
Angus Houston, the head of the JACC, is appointed as Australia's special envoy in Ukraine to recover and repatriate bodies of Australian victims and ensure that a proper investigation of the crash of Flight 17 is initiated in accordance with international standards. Around this time, Houston leaves the agency; Deputy Coordinator Judith Zielke assumes leadership of the JACC and is later appointed its Chief Coordinator.

6 August
Australia awards Fugro a A$50 million (US$46,6 million) contract to conduct the underwater search. Malaysia also commits vessels to the bathymetric survey and underwater search effort.

8 August
Khazanah Nasional—the majority shareholder (69.37 percent) and a Malaysian state-run investment arm—announces its plan to purchase the remainder of the airline, thereby renationalising it. The move has been anticipated because of the airline's poor financial performance, which has been exacerbated by the combined effect on consumer confidence of the loss of Flights 370 and 17.

14 August
An HSBC employee and her husband are arrested for allegedly siphoning 111,000 Malaysian ringgit (US$35,000) from bank accounts of several Flight 370 passengers in July.

20 September
The Zhu Kezhen finishes bathymetric survey operations and begins its return passage to China.

== October 2014 – June 2015 ==
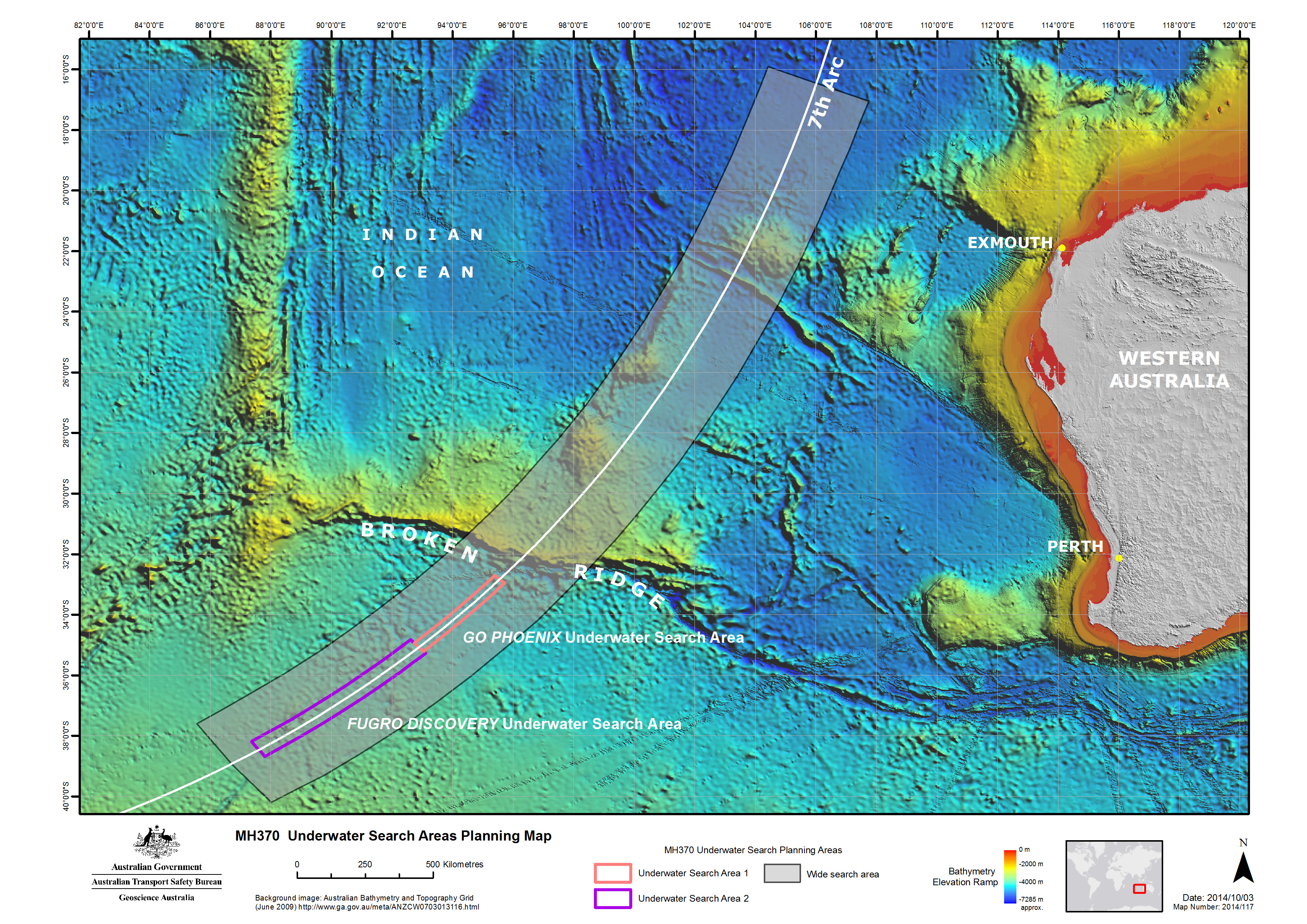
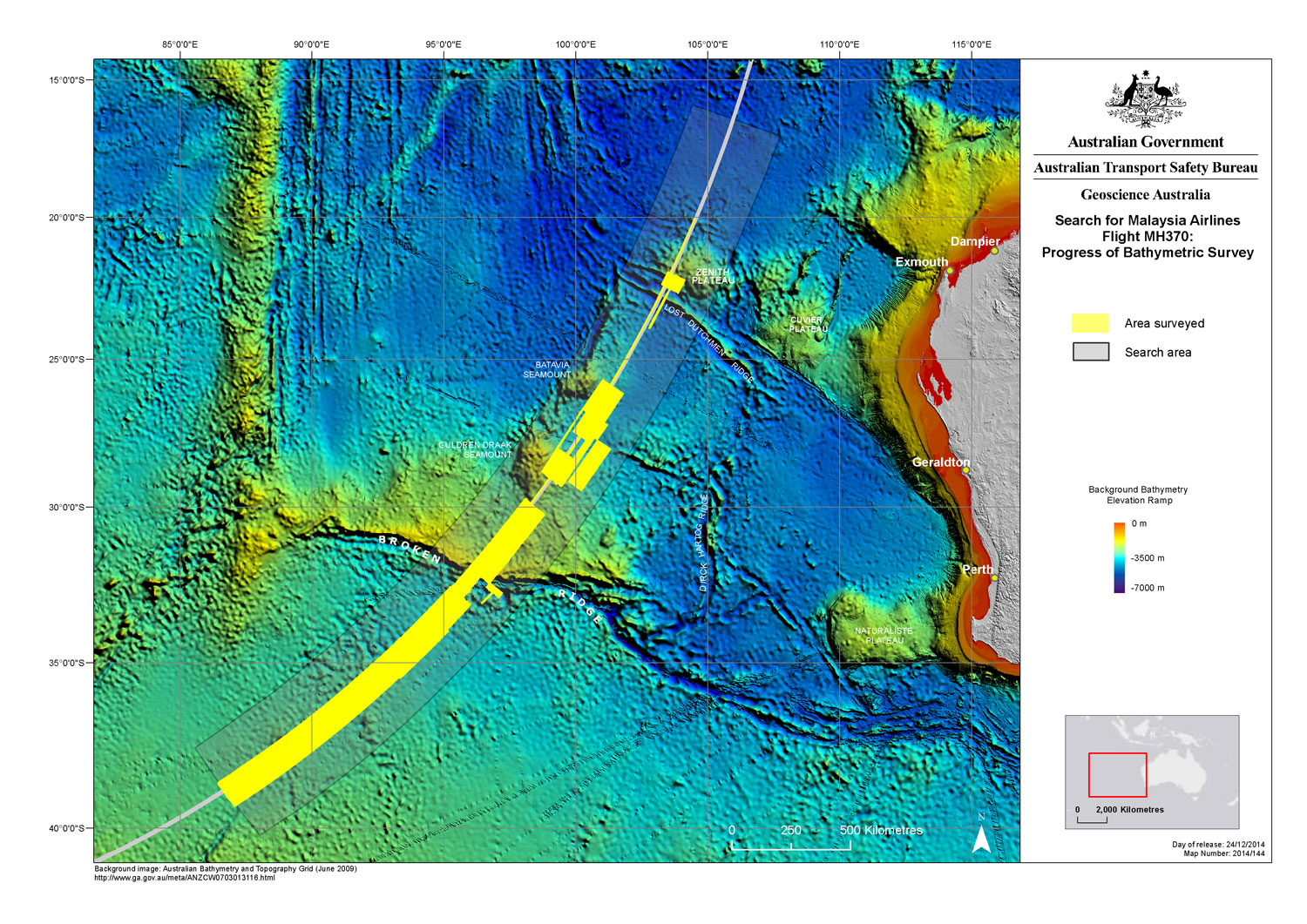
Left: Areas where the underwater search would begin compared with the entire underwater search area (light grey) and the BTO arc at the time of the 7th handshake at 08:19 MYT (UTC+8). The purple area would be searched by the MV Fugro Discovery and the pink area will be searched by the MV GO Phoenix. Right: Areas where the bathymetric survey had been completed (in yellow) as of 17 December 2014—a total of 208,000 km^{2} (80,000 sq mi) of seafloor.

The underwater search commences on 6 October. The search involves four vessels: the GO Phoenix (6 October–20 June), Fugro Discovery (joined search 23 October), Fugro Equator (joined search 15 January), and Fugro Supporter (29 January–early May). The bathymetric survey was suspended on 17 December for the only remaining ship performing the survey, the Fugro Discovery, to be refitted to join the underwater search. During the bathymetyric survey, 208,000 km^{2} (80,000 sq mi) of seafloor was charted.

On 8 October, the ATSB releases a report on the latest analysis of satellite communications, determining that the most likely location of the aircraft is south of the priority area identified in June. Officials say the search will begin in the area determined in the report. One year after the flight's disappearance, Malaysia declares Flight 370 an accident in accordance with the Chicago Convention in January 2015 (Note: Despite the March 2014 announcement that Flight 370 ended in the southern Indian Ocean, officials did not change the status of the flight to an "accident" until the 29 January declaration. The move allows families of passengers to proceed with compensation claims.) and releases an interim report about Flight 370, focusing on factual information.

6 October
The underwater search begins. GO Phoenix, which left port at Jakarta on 24 September, begins work about 1,800 km (1,100 mi) west of Western Australia.

8 October
Officials announce that the priority area to be searched is south of the area identified in the June ATSB report. The ATSB releases a supplement to the June report detailing the methodology behind refinements to the analysis of satellite communications, which resulted in the shift of the priority search area.

A peer-reviewed paper is published online by the Journal of Navigation—a journal of the Royal Institute of Navigation—by Inmarsat scientists who analysed the communications with Flight 370. The paper details the methodology of the calculations and the way continual changes, especially during the first few weeks of the search, resulted in the shifting search zones. It was released as an open access article with a Creative Commons Attribution license.

23 October
Fugro Discovery commences search operations.

26 October
Fugro Equator ends its bathymetric survey operations and leaves for Fremantle, where it will be refitted and mobilised to join GO Phoenix and Fugro Discovery in the underwater search. Over 150,000 km^{2} (58,000 sq mi) of seafloor have been surveyed. If necessary, bathymetric survey operations may recommence in the future.

16 November
Fugro Equator leaves Fremantle to resume work on the bathymetric survey after the arrival of equipment needed for the underwater search is delayed.

External videos
- Search for MH370 A video produced by the JACC explaining the complexities and activities related to the underwater search.

19 November
The JACC releases a video explaining the work being carried out and the complexities of the underwater search.

Bathymetry of the MH370 Search Area, released 16 December

17 December
Fugro Equator finishes bathymetric survey work and leaves for Fremantle, where it will be refitted for the underwater search. The bathymetric survey charted 208,000 km^{2} (80,000 sq mi) of seafloor. The ATSB releases a video titled Bathymetry of the MH370 Search Area, which presents a visualisation of the bathymetric data collected in the search area.

15 January 2015
Fugro Equator joins the search. It left Fremantle on 6 January.

18 January
Search operations are suspended due to 5–6 m (16–20 ft) waves caused by Tropical Cyclone Bansi. The search fully resumes by 23 January.

22 January
The ATSB calls for expressions of interest for operations to recover Flight 370 so a recovery effort can be quickly and effectively mobilised if and when debris from the aircraft is located. The request will allow the ATSB to determine which organisations can supply equipment and expertise for the recovery effort.

29 January
In accordance with Annexes 12 and 13 to the Chicago Convention, the Malaysian government officially declares the disappearance of Flight 370 an accident with no survivors.

A fourth vessel, MV Fugro Supporter, joins the underwater search. It is equipped with a Kongsberg HUGIN 4500 autonomous underwater vehicle and will be able to search areas which cannot be effectively searched by the towfish used by the other vessels.

Fugro Discovery in sea state 1–4 (waves up to 2.5 m / 10 ft). Sea states up to 8 (waves 9–14 m / 30–46 ft) were encountered in early February.

1 February
Search operations are suspended due to effects of tropical cyclone Eunice and ex-tropical cyclone Diamondra, which are causing ocean conditions up to sea state 8 with waves of 9–14 m (30–46 ft). Search operations are resumed on 5 February by Fugro Equator, 8 February by Fugro Discovery, and 9 February by Fugro Supporter. (Note: MV GO Phoenix suspended operations for a scheduled return to port on 28 January and resumed search activities on 10 February.)

8 March
On the first anniversary of the flight's disappearance, Malaysia's Ministry of Transport releases an interim report that is required by international protocol. The report focuses on factual information rather than analysis of possible causes of Flight 370's disappearance. One significant issue, not previously revealed publicly, is that the battery in the underwater locator beacon attached to the flight data recorder had expired in December 2013, which may have compromised its performance.

17 March
The search resumes after being suspended for several days because of poor weather associated with ex-Tropical Cyclone Haliba.

2 April
Fugro Discovery leaves port in Fremantle with a new towfish named Intrepid. After calibration trials at sea, the vessel will leave for the search area on 5 April.

16 April
A tripartite meeting between Malaysian, Australian and Chinese officials is held. Over 60 percent of the 60,000 km^{2} (23,000 sq mi) priority search area has been searched. Excluding significant delays, the search of the priority search area will be completed around May 2015. The officials agree that if no trace of the aircraft is found in the priority search area, the underwater search will be extended to an additional 60,000 km^{2} (23,000 sq mi) of adjacent seafloor.

Angus Houston was appointed Knight of the Order of Australia in recognition of his military service and his "continued commitment to serve the nation in leadership roles, particularly the national responses to the [Malaysia Airlines Flight 370] and [Malaysia Airlines Flight 17] disasters".

External images
- Shipwreck image 1 An anchor is visible in the centre-left portion of the image.
- Shipwreck image 2
- Shipwreck image 3 The numerous small, dark objects are believed to be pieces of coal.

Early May
Fugro Supporter withdraws from the underwater search and travels to Fremantle, where the autonomous underwater vehicle (AUV) it operated is offloaded. Sea conditions during the austral winter are too rough to safely launch and recover the AUV and therefore, AUV operations will be suspended during the winter months. However, the AUV will be kept ready to assist the search at short notice.

13 May
The JACC and ATSB announce the discovery of a shipwreck 12 nmi (22 km; 14 mi) east of the seventh BTO arc at a depth of 3,900 m (12,800 ft). Fugro Equator detected a cluster of small objects in an otherwise featureless region of seafloor. It was classified as a "Class 2" feature "of potential interest but unlikely to be related to MH370". Fugro Supporter was sent to investigate the site with its AUVs. A high-resolution sonar scan reveals many small objects, the largest of which is rectangular and 6 m (20 ft) on its longest side. Another AUV mission photographed the debris field, revealing the shipwreck and a field of cricket ball-sized coal. The images are sent to marine archaeologists to identify the wreck.

30 May–6 June
Search operations are suspended due to rough ocean conditions, including average wave heights of 6 m (20 ft).

3–16 June
Go Phoenix leaves the search area to return to port. The supporting frame of the vessel's towfish system was damaged while on the vessel's deck during rough seas; the vessel's supply of gasses for welding was exhausted before repairs could be completed. Repairs were completed and the vessel left port on 10 June, arriving in the search area on 16 June.

20 June
GO Phoenix departs the search area to begin passage to Singapore, where it will be demobilized from search activities.

The items are transported the following day to Toulouse, France for analysis.

31 July
A Chinese water bottle and an Indonesian cleaning product are found on Réunion in the vicinity of the location where the aircraft flaperon and suitcase were found.

2 August
The Malaysian Ministry of Transportation announces that the first object discovered is a flaperon from a Boeing 777; they state that the verification was made with investigators from France, Malaysia, Boeing, and the US NTSB.

5 August
The Malaysian Prime Minister announces that experts have "conclusively confirmed" that the flaperon found on 29 July is from Flight 370; the debris is the first physical evidence that Flight 370 ended in the Indian Ocean.

6 August
Malaysia's Transport Ministry claims that window panes and aircraft seat cushions have washed up on Réunion. This claim is disputed by France.

7 August
Maldivian police investigate claims that plane debris has washed up on North Malé Atoll, Maldives. Authorities in nearby Mauritius have also begun searching for debris and sent a piece of a bag found on Îlot Gabriel for inspection.

12 August
A packet of Malaysian noodles were found in South Australia and a Malaysia Airlines baggage tag was found in Nowra, New South Wales. The items were turned into Australian authorities, who noted that "It's very challenging for investigators to find something that can be linked to the aircraft – it would really have to be some form of debris from the aircraft. But we encourage people to bring anything unusual or out of place forward. It's far better that we investigate and rule it out."
The debris from North Malé is flown to Malaysia for investigation.
Malaysia's government news agency published a new theory that Flight 370 made a soft landing on the water, floated for a while on the surface, and then sank mostly in one piece. Many experts also believe in this theory.

3 September
French investigators affirm "with certainty" that the aircraft flaperon discovered on 29 July is from Flight 370, due to a serial number that matched the records of the Spanish manufacturer that produced portions of the flaperon.

8 September
Australia's Commonwealth Scientific and Industrial Research Organisation (CSIRO) releases a drift analysis that concludes that the finding of the flaperon on Réunion is consistent with the current search area for Flight 370.

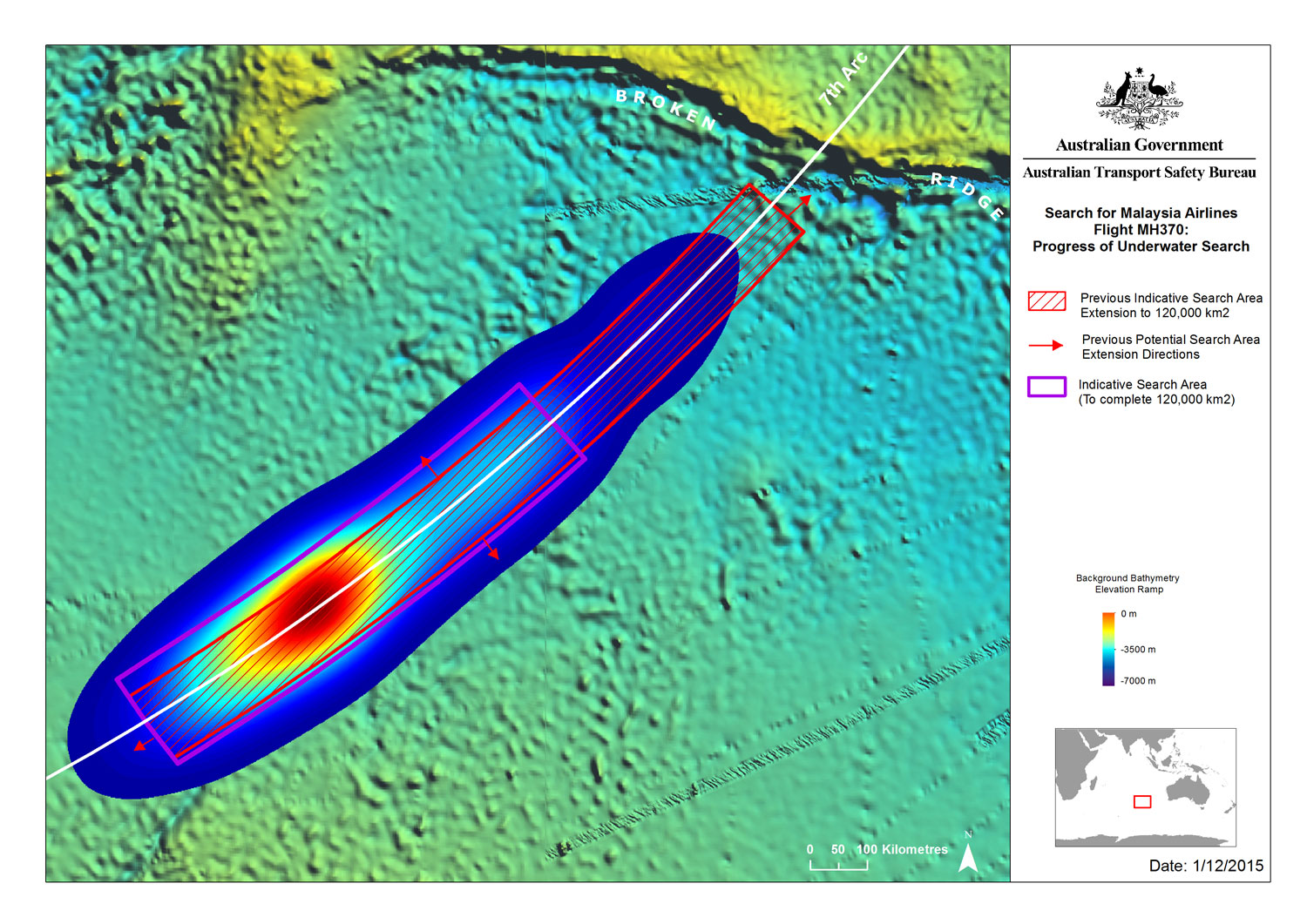
A heat map of the probable final location of Flight 370 according to the DST Group analysis.

3 December
The ATSB publishes a report, based on analysis by Australia's Defence Science and Technology Group (DST Group). The analysis determined that the most probable location of Flight 370 when it entered the water is within the southern half of the existing search zone. The JACC also releases a pre-publication draft of Bayesian methods in the search for MH370, a book by the DST Group detailing their analysis.
Australian Deputy Prime Minister Warren Truss announces the number of vessels in the search would be doubled to four, and that the undersea search was expected to be completed by June 2016.

5 December
The MV Havila Harmony arrives in the search area, becoming the third vessel actively involved in the search. The Havila Harmony is carrying an AUV that will be deployed to search the most challenging underwater terrain.

19 December
A second 19th-century shipwreck is discovered.

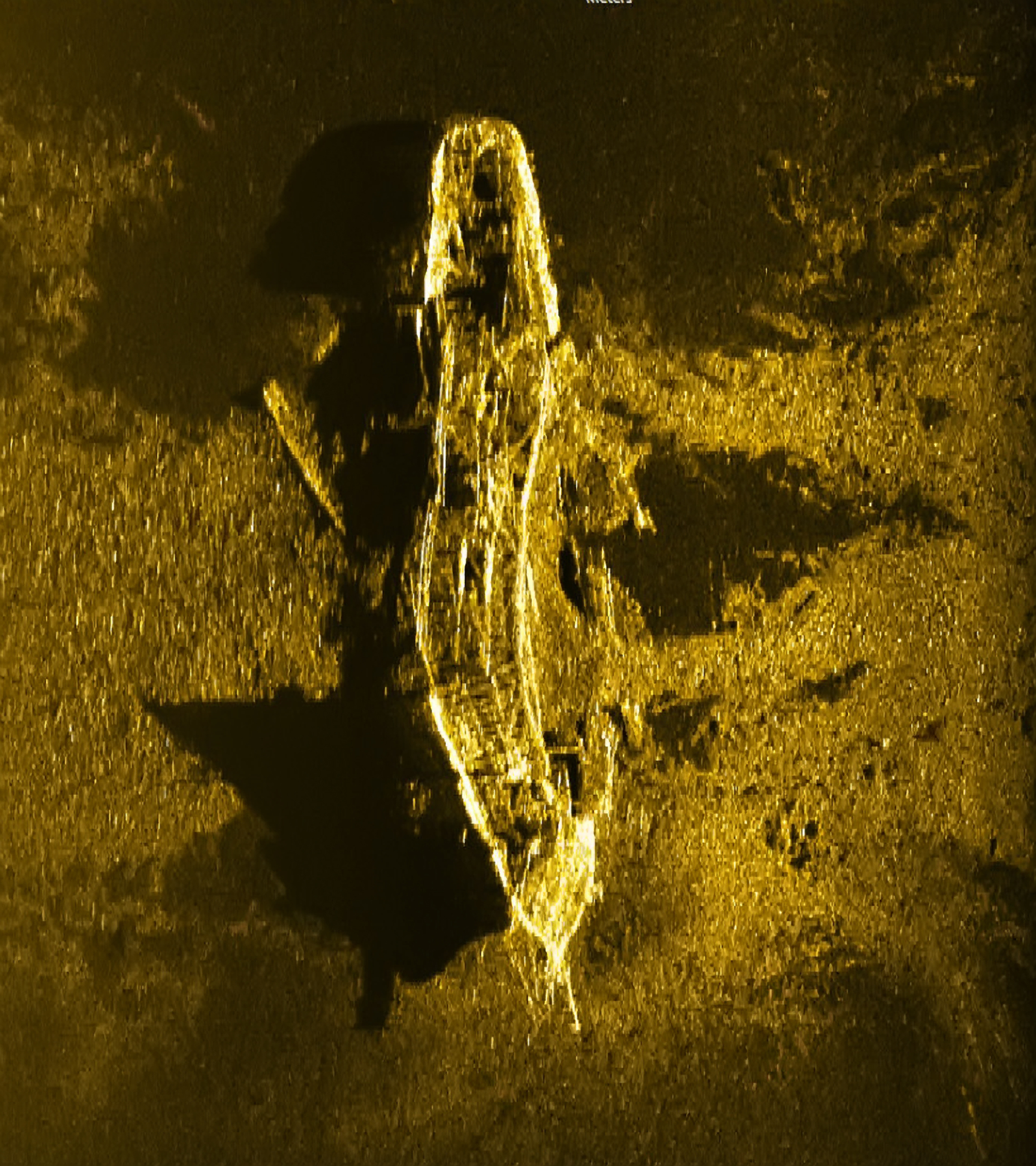
A two-dimensional image produced by side-scan sonar of the shipwreck discovered in December 2015

2 January 2016
The AUV aboard the MV Havila Harmony is used to produce a high-resolution sonar image of an "anomalous sonar contact" made on 19 December that analysis suggested to be man-made and possibly a shipwreck. The AUV sonar imagery confirms the object is a shipwreck.

24 January
The towfish being used by the Fugro Discovery collides with an undersea mud volcano. The towing cable breaks and the towfish along with 4,500 metres of towing cable sink to the seafloor.

29 January
Australia announces that a fourth ship will join the search. The Dong Hai Jiu 101 is being supplied by China and will employ a towfish operated by Phoenix International Holdings and Hydrospheric Solutions, both companies with previous experience in the search for Flight 370. The ship is expected to join the search in late February.

2 March
Media report the discovery of an object, a suspected horizontal stabilizer, found on a sandbar in Mozambique, that may have originated from a Boeing 777. The object, found by an American tourist the preceding weekend, is flown to Australia for examination.

24 March
Australian Transport Minister Darren Chester announces that two pieces of debris, the object reported discovered earlier in March as well as an object found in Mozambique by a South African tourist in December 2015, are both "almost certainly" from MH370.
Part of an engine cowling is found on the coast of South Africa.

2 April
A piece of debris that is suspected to be a bulkhead from inside the cabin of an aircraft is discovered on the coast of Rodrigues, an autonomous island in Mauritius.

12 May
Malaysian Transport Minister Liow Tiong Lai announces that the engine cowling discovered on 24 March in South Africa and the bulkhead discovered on 2 April in Rodrigues are "almost certainly" from Flight 370.

24 June
The Australian Transport Minister, Darren Chester, said that a piece of aircraft debris was found on Pemba Island, off of the coast of Tanzania. It was handed over to the authorities so that experts from Malaysia can determine whether it is part of the aircraft. The Australian government released photos of the piece, believed to be an outboard wing flap, on 20 July.

22 July
A meeting of senior ministers from Australia, China, and Malaysia is held in Putrajaya, Malaysia. Less than 10,000 km^{2} (3,900 sq mi) of the 120,000 km^{2} (46,000 sq mi) high priority search area remains to be searched. The ministers agree that if no credible new evidence pointing to a particular location where the aircraft may be is found, the search will be suspended after the 120,000 km^{2} (46,000 sq mi) high priority search area is completely searched.

27 July
Scientists from the Euro-Mediterranean Center on Climate Change publish a paper analysing where wreckage was found with ocean drift. This predicted an area for the crash site, further north than the ATSB search area.

15 September
Malaysia's transport ministry confirms that the outboard wing flap discovered on 24 June on Pemba Island originated from Flight 370, due to identifying part numbers and date stamps.

20 December
The ATSB releases a report suggesting a new 25,000 km^{2} (9,700 mi^{2}) search area north of the current search area. The report noted that "if this area were to be searched, prospective areas for locating the aircraft wreckage, based on all the analysis to date, would be exhausted." However, the Australian government stated that the search would not be extended beyond the current search area without new evidence.

17 January 2017
The underwater search for the wreckage of Flight 370 is officially suspended after the survey of 120,000 km^{2} (46,000 sq mi) of the southern Indian Ocean fails to recover the plane. The search is reported to have cost $160 million.

== January 2018 – December 2025 ==
In January 2018, a second search for Flight 370 was launched by private company Ocean Infinity but ended without success in June of that year. Over the following years, the Malaysian government reiterated its openness to resuming the search if credible new evidence emerged. In 2024, Ocean Infinity proposed a new "no find, no fee" search, which was approved by the Malaysian cabinet in late 2024. This new search phase began in early 2025, was temporarily suspended due to seasonal weather, and is scheduled to resume in December 2025.

January 2018
A new search was launched by Ocean Infinity covering the new 25,000 km^{2} (9,700 mi^{2}) search area defined by the ATSB in December 2017. The search ended six months later without success. Data collected during the search is donated to the Nippon Foundation–GEBCO Seabed 2030 Project.

March 2019
On the fifth anniversary of the disappearance, the Malaysian government states it is willing to review any "credible leads or specific proposals" for a new search.

6 March 2022
Ocean Infinity commits to resuming the search in 2023 or 2024, pending Malaysian government approval.

8 March 2023
On the ninth anniversary, Malaysian Transport Minister Anthony Loke vows not to "close the book" on MH370 and to consider future searches if new credible information emerges.

3 March 2024
Days before the tenth anniversary, Malaysia announces it will consult with Australia regarding a collaboration on a new expedition by Ocean Infinity.

2 May
Ocean Infinity submits a proposal for a new search to the Malaysian Ministry of Transport.

20 December
The Malaysian government approves a new search by Ocean Infinity covering a 15,000 km^{2} (5,800 sq mi) area in the southern Indian Ocean. The search is agreed on a "no find, no fee" basis with a potential cost of $70 million.

25 February 2025
Transport Minister Loke confirms that Ocean Infinity has resumed the search.

3 April
Ocean Infinity suspends the search due to seasonal weather conditions, planning to resume later in the year.

3 December
The Malaysian Transport Ministry issues an official statement confirming search operations will resume on 30 December 2025 for 55 days in targeted high-probability areas.

8 March 2026
Ocean Infinity announces that their search concluded as of 23 January 2026 without any findings, after searching an area of over 140,000 square kilometres (54,054 sq mi).
