= Malaysia Airlines Flight 370 satellite communications =

Overview of MH370's satellite-transmitted messages

The analysis of communications between Malaysia Airlines Flight 370 and Inmarsat's satellite telecommunication network provide the primary (Note: Along with the drift analysis of the debris found on Réunion Island and elsewhere, and hydrophone events.) source of information about Flight 370's location and possible in-flight events after it disappeared from military radar coverage at 02:22 Malaysia Standard Time (MYT) on 8 March 2014 (17:22 UTC, 7 March), one hour after communication with air traffic control ended and the aircraft departed from its planned flight path while over the South China Sea.

Flight 370 was a scheduled commercial flight with 227 passengers and 12 crew which departed Kuala Lumpur, Malaysia, at 0:41 MYT (16:41 UTC, 7 March) and was scheduled to land in Beijing, China, at 6:30 China Standard Time (6:30 MYT; 22:30 UTC, 7 March). Malaysia has worked in conjunction with the Australian Transport Safety Bureau to co-ordinate the analysis, which has also involved the UK's Air Accidents Investigation Branch, Inmarsat, and US National Transportation Safety Board. Other groups have also made efforts to analyse the satellite communications, albeit challenged by a lack of publicly available information for several months after the disappearance. On 29 July 2015, debris was discovered on Réunion Island which was later confirmed to have come from Flight 370; it is the first physical evidence that Flight 370 ended in the Indian Ocean.

During flight, the aircraft maintains a datalink with a satellite communication network for data and telephone calls. The datalink connects the aircraft and a ground station via satellite, which translates (changes) the signal's frequency and amplifies the signal; the ground station is connected to telecommunication networks which allows messages to be sent to and received from other locations, such as the airline's operations centre. Normal communications from Flight 370 were last made at 1:07 MYT. The datalink between the aircraft and satellite telecommunication network was lost at some point between 1:07 and 2:03, when the aircraft did not acknowledge a message sent from the ground station. Three minutes after the aircraft left the range of radar coverage—at 2:25—the aircraft's satellite data unit (SDU) transmitted a log-on message, which investigators believe occurred when the SDU restarted after a power interruption. Between the 2:25 message and 8:19, the SDU acknowledged two ground-to-aircraft telephone calls, which were not answered, and responded to automated, hourly requests from the ground station that were made to determine whether the SDU was still active. None of the communications from 2:25-8:19 contain explicit information about the aircraft's location. The aircraft's final transmission at 8:19 was a log-on message; the aircraft did not respond to a message from the ground station at 9:15. Investigators believe the 8:19 log-on message was made when the SDU was restarting after the aircraft ran out of fuel and the aircraft's ram air turbine started generating electrical power.

The search for Flight 370 was launched in Southeast Asia near the location of the last verbal and radar contact with air traffic control. The day after the disappearance, staff at Inmarsat reviewed the log of communications between their satellite network and Flight 370 and discovered that they continued for several hours after contact with air traffic control was lost. On 11 March, they provided a preliminary analysis to investigators based on recorded burst timing offset (BTO) values. Relatively simple calculations can be made from BTO values to determine the distance between the aircraft and satellite at each transmission. When these distances are plotted on Earth, they result in rings which are then further reduced to arcs, due to the limited flying range of the aircraft. Another value—burst frequency offset (BFO)—was analysed to determine the movement of the aircraft relative to the satellite, based on the Doppler shift of the signals, which provides the location of the aircraft along the BTO-derived arcs. Initial analysis of the BFO values showed a strong correlation with a track south into the southern Indian Ocean, west of Australia. On 24 March, Malaysia's Prime Minister cited this analysis to conclude that Flight 370 ended in the southern Indian Ocean with no survivors. After the initial analysis, the BFO calculations were later adjusted to account for a wobble in the satellite's orbit and thermal changes in the satellite which affected the recorded BFO values. Further analysis considered the BTO and BFO calculations together with the aircraft flight dynamics, such as possible and probable aircraft speeds, altitudes, and autopilot modes. Two statistical analyses were made and combined with calculations of Flight 370's maximum range to determine the most probable location of Flight 370 at the time of the 8:19 transmission, which is along the 8:19 BTO arc from approximately 38.3°S 88°E to 33.5°S 95°E.

== Background ==
=== Malaysia Airlines Flight 370 ===
Known flight path taken by Flight 370 (red), derived from primary (military) and secondary (ATC) radar data.

Malaysia Airlines Flight 370 departed Kuala Lumpur International Airport at 00:41 Malaysia Standard Time (MYT) on 8 March 2014 (16:41 UTC, 7 March), bound for Beijing Capital International Airport. At 1:19, Malaysian air traffic control (ATC) initiated a hand-off to Ho Chi Minh area ATC. The captain responded "Good night Malaysian Three Seven Zero", after which no further communications were made with the pilots. At 01:21, the aircraft disappeared from the radar of air traffic control after passing navigational waypoint IGARI (6°56′12″N 103°35′6″E) in the South China Sea between Malaysia and Vietnam. The aircraft continued to be tracked by Malaysian military radar, which recorded that Flight 370 deviated from its planned flight path, turning around and crossing the Malay Peninsula. Flight 370 left the range of Malaysian military radar at 02:22 and was last located 200 nmi (370 km; 230 mi) northwest of Penang. Flight 370 was expected to arrive in Beijing at 06:30 China Standard Time (CST) on 8 March (06:30 MYT; 22:30 UTC, 7 March). At 07:24 MYT/CST, Malaysia Airlines issued a media statement that Flight 370 was missing.

=== Satellite datalink ===
The datalink for Malaysia Airline's avionics communications at the time of the incident was supplied by SITA, which contracted with Inmarsat to provide a satellite communication link using Inmarsat's Classic Aero service. Aeronautical satellite communication (SATCOM) systems are used to transmit messages from the aircraft cockpit as well as automated messages from on-board systems using the ACARS communications protocol, but may also be used to transmit FANS and ATN messages and provide voice, fax, and data links using other protocols. An appropriate comparison of ACARS' relationship to the SATCOM system is that of a messaging application to a smartphone; the smartphone functions and will remain registered on a mobile phone network even if the messaging application is closed.

The data/messages from the aircraft are transmitted by the aircraft's Satellite Data Unit (SDU) (Note: Alternatively known as the "aircraft terminal" or "aircraft earth station", with respect to the network) and relayed via satellite to a ground station, (Note: The "Ground Earth Station" with respect to the network) where they are routed to other communication networks to reach their destination. Messages may also be sent to the aircraft, in reverse order. When passing through the satellite, the signals are amplified and translated in frequency—mixed with the signal from an oscillator in the satellite, leaving the satellite at the combined frequency. Transmissions from the aircraft are made on one of several channels (frequencies) near 1.6 GHz, combined with frequency of the satellite's oscillator, and transmitted to the GES at the combined frequency (one of several channels near 3.6 GHz). The ground station then translates the received signal before it reaches equipment to be processed. The ground station keeps a log of transmissions and some data about them.

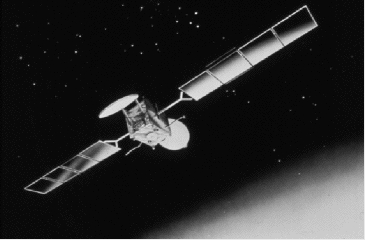
A depiction of an Inmarsat-3 series satellite. Flight 370 was in contact with Inmarsat-3 F1 (also known as "IOR" for Indian Ocean Region).

When the SDU tries to connect with the Inmarsat network, it will transmit a log-on request, which the ground station acknowledges. This is, in part, to determine that the SDU belongs to an active service subscriber and also used to determine how to route messages to the SDU. After connecting, if a ground station hasn't received any contact from a terminal for one hour, (Note: The timing of the log-on interrogation message is determined by an inactivity timer, which was set to one hour at the time Flight 370 disappeared (it was later reduced to 15 minutes).) the ground station will transmit a "Log-on Interrogation" (LOI) message—informally referred to as a "ping"; an active terminal automatically responds. The entire process of interrogating the terminal is referred to as a "handshake".

Equipment at Inmarsat's Perth ground station had been upgraded in 2013 with additional storage capacity and new software to record an expanded data set for transmissions, including the addition of Burst Frequency Offset (BFO) and Burst Timing Offset (BTO) values. Without the additional data values, it would have been impossible to determine the aircraft's distance from the satellite at each handshake. The expanded data values were prompted by Inmarsat's involvement in the search for Air France Flight 447, which disappeared over the Atlantic Ocean in 2009. According to Mark Dickinson, Inmarsat's vice-president of satellite operations, the company did not know what the additional data might be used for, but had a "hunch" and upgraded their hardware.

=== Emergency locator transmitters ===
The aircraft was equipped with four emergency locator transmitters (ELTs):

- a fixed ELT on the aft fuselage which is activated by sudden deceleration,
- a portable ELT in a cabinet located in the front of the aircraft which must be activated by moving a switch, and
- two ELTs attached to slide rafts which are armed when the rafts are inflated and activated by water immersion

Once activated, the ELTs emit a radio signal which can be detected by the satellites of the International Cospas-Sarsat Programme. The ELTs are designed to work at or near the water's surface. Damage during a crash, shielding by aircraft wreckage or terrain, and submersion in deep water are all factors which may prevent the signal's detection. In a review of accident records maintained by ICAO over the past 30 years, there were 173 accidents involving aircraft over 5,700 kilograms (12,566 lb) equipped with ELTs; of these, an effective ELT detection was made in only 39 accidents. No signals from ELTs aboard Flight 370 were detected.

== Communications from Flight 370 ==
The SDU on 9M-MRO (the aircraft used for Flight 370) logged onto the Inmarsat network at midnight MYT. (Note: Unless stated otherwise, all times in this article are in Malaysia Standard Time (UTC+8).) In the 30 minutes before take-off, seventeen messages were exchanged between the SDU and the Inmarsat network. An additional three messages were exchanged between take-off and the time Flight 370 disappeared from secondary radar. The final message to use the ACARS protocol was sent at 01:07; ACARS reports expected at 01:37 and 02:07 were not received. At 02:03 and 2:05, messages from the ground station went unanswered, indicating that the link was lost at some point between 01:07 and 02:03.

After last contact by primary radar west of Malaysia, the following records were recorded in the log of Inmarsat's ground station at Perth, Western Australia (HH:MM:SS; UTC times 7–8 March): (Note: Information released and reported publicly about SATCOM transmissions from Flight 370 have been inconsistent, especially the use of the terms 'ping' and 'handshake'. It was initially reported as 6 'handshakes'/'pings' with one 'partial handshake/ping' sent at 08:19 MYT by Flight 370, unprovoked by the ground station. The events listed may consist of several 'transmissions' between the aircraft and ground station over the course of a few seconds. A readable copy of the ground station log of transmissions to/from Flight 370 is available here.)

Time (MYT)	Time (UTC)	Initiated by	Name (if any)	Details
02:25:27	18:25:27	Aircraft	1st handshake	A 'log-on request' message. Flight 370 now registered as an active terminal on Inmarsat network.
02:39:52	18:39:52	Ground station	–	Ground to aircraft telephone call, acknowledged by SDU, unanswered
03:41:00	19:41:00	Ground station	2nd handshake	Normal handshake
04:41:02	20:41:02	Ground station	3rd handshake	Normal handshake
05:41:24	21:41:24	Ground station	4th handshake	Normal handshake
06:41:19	22:41:19	Ground station	5th handshake	Normal handshake
07:13:58	23:13:58	Ground station	–	Ground to aircraft telephone call, acknowledged by SDU, unanswered
08:10:58	00:10:58	Ground station	6th handshake	Normal handshake
08:19:29	00:19:29	Aircraft	7th handshake (Note: One of two transmissions from the aircraft which, together with six transmissions from the ground station, comprises the "7th handshake", also reported as a "partial handshake.")	A 'log-on request' from the aircraft, followed by an acknowledgement and four other transmissions from the ground station.
08:19:37	00:19:37	Aircraft	7th handshake	'Log-on acknowledge' message transmitted by aircraft. This is the final transmission received from Flight 370.
09:15	01:15	Ground station	Unsuccessful ping/handshake	Three handshake requests from the ground station, without a response from the aircraft. Indicating that the aircraft had already crashed or lost power.

== Analysis by the Joint Investigation Team ==
The analysis of the satellite communication relies on a limited number of data points that were analysed using innovative techniques that were only developed after the incident. The analysis has worked to determine useful information about in-flight events and the location of Flight 370 at the 08:19 MYT signal—believed to have occurred near the time of fuel exhaustion and thus is close to the final location of Flight 370.

=== Joint Investigation Team ===
Malaysian investigators set up an international working group—the Joint Investigation Team (JIT)—consisting of various agencies with experience in aircraft performance and satellite communications, to further analyse the signals between Flight 370 and the ground station, especially the signal at 08:19. These included representatives from the UK's Inmarsat, Air Accidents Investigation Branch, and Rolls-Royce; China's Civil Aviation Administration and Aircraft Accident Investigation Department; the US National Transportation Safety Board and Federal Aviation Administration; and Malaysian authorities.

After initial analysis determined that Flight 370's last location was within Australia's Search and Rescue region in the southern Indian Ocean, Australia played a major role in co-ordinating the analysis in conjunction with Malaysia. The Australian Transport Safety Bureau (ATSB)—responsible for the search for Flight 370—brought together a team of experts to determine the location of Flight 370 at the 08:19 communication. The team included the UK's Air Accidents Investigation Branch, Boeing, the Defence Science and Technology Organisation (Australia), Malaysia's Department of Civil Aviation, Inmarsat, the National Transportation Safety Board (US), and Thales.

=== Concepts ===
The analysis of communications from Flight 370 focuses on two key parameters associated with the messages:

- Burst timing offset (BTO) — The time difference between when a message is sent from the ground station and when the response is received. This measure is proportional to twice the distance from the ground station to the satellite to the aircraft. It includes the time between receiving and responding to the message at the aircraft SDU and the time between receiving and processing the response at the ground station, which are constant and can be calculated and removed. This measure can be analysed to determine the distance between the satellite and the aircraft, resulting in a spherical segment extending upward from the Earth's surface that is equidistant from the satellite between ground level and flight ceiling.
- Burst frequency offset (BFO) – The difference between the expected and received frequency of transmissions. The difference is caused by doppler shift as the signals traveled from the aircraft to the satellite to the ground station; the frequency translations made in the satellite and at the ground station; a small, constant error (bias) in the SDU that results from drift and ageing; and compensation applied by the SDU to counter the Doppler shift on the uplink. This measure can be analysed to determine where along the BTO rings the aircraft was located.

=== Deductions ===
A few deductions can also be made from the satellite communications. The first deduction that can be made from the satellite communications is that the aircraft remained operational until at least 08:19—seven hours after final contact was made with air traffic control over the South China Sea. The varying BFO values indicate the aircraft was moving at speed. The aircraft's SDU needs location and track information to keep its antenna pointed towards the satellite, so it can also be deduced that the aircraft's navigation system was operational.

Since the aircraft did not respond to a ping at 09:15, it can be concluded that at some point between 08:19 and 09:15, the aircraft lost the ability to communicate with the ground station. Malaysia's Department of Civil Aviation noted this time was "consistent with the maximum endurance of the aircraft" and this time is believed to have been the result of the aircraft entering the ocean after fuel starvation. The ATSB is "confident the seventh handshake represents the area where the aircraft ran out of fuel before entering the ocean."

The log-on message sent from the aircraft at 08:19:29 was not immediately well understood. The 02:25 handshake was also initiated by the aircraft. Only a few reasons that the SDU would transmit a log-on message exist, such as a power interruption, software failure, loss of critical systems providing input to the SDU, or a loss of the link due to aircraft altitude. Investigators consider the most likely reason to be that they were sent during power-up after an electrical outage. At 08:19, the aircraft had been airborne for 7 h 38 min; the typical Kuala Lumpur-Beijing flight is 5 1/2 hours and fuel exhaustion was likely. In the event of fuel exhaustion and engine flame-out, the aircraft's ram air turbine would deploy, providing power to various instruments and flight controls, including the SDU. Approximately 90 seconds after the 02:25 handshake, communications from the aircraft's inflight entertainment system were recorded in the ground station log. Similar messages would be expected following the 08:19 handshake but none were received, supporting the fuel starvation scenario.

=== Burst timing offset ===
Relationship of the recorded BTO values to the time slot (top) and the path travelled (bottom).

For system efficiency and reliability, aircraft transmissions made in response to a signal from a satellite are sent in timed slots referenced to the time the signal from the satellite arrived, using the slotted ALOHA protocol. The time that the signal is sent from the ground station begins the time slot. The burst timing offset (BTO) is the time difference between the start of the time slot and the start of the transmission received from the aircraft; it equals twice the distance (for the ground station's signal and the aircraft's response) from the ground station to the satellite to the aircraft plus the time the aircraft's SDU takes between receiving the signal and responding (the SDU bias) and the delay between the time the signal arrives at the ground station and the time it is processed (when the BTO value is logged; the ground station bias). The satellite's location is known, thus the distance from the satellite to the ground station can be calculated, while the combined bias of the SDU and ground station is relatively constant and can be calculated from signals exchanged earlier in the flight while it was on the ground at KLIA, thus leaving the distance between the aircraft and satellite as the only variable.

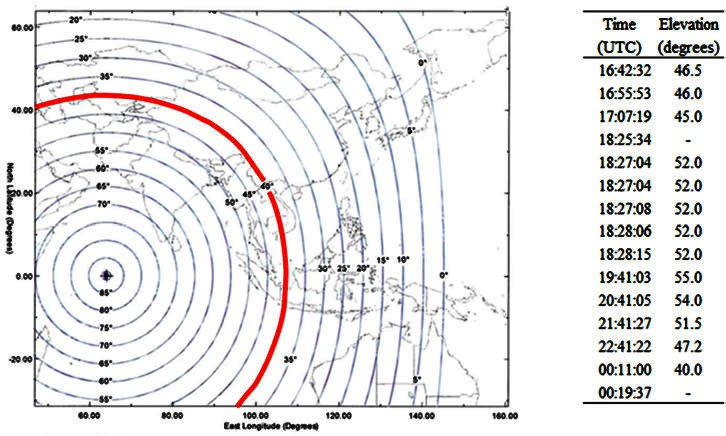
The BTO arc of the sixth handshake and a table of elevation angles of transmissions from the plane.

The combined SDU and ground station bias was calculated from 17 signals exchanged between the ground station and the aircraft during a 30-minute period before take-off, when the aircraft's location was known (at Kuala Lumpur International Airport). To establish the accuracy of their calculations, the bias value was used to calculate the distance from the aircraft to the satellite during the time it was on the ground at KLIA, with errors of <1–8.85 km (0.62–5.50 mi). The distance from the satellite to the aircraft was also calculated while the aircraft was in-flight and at a known location shortly after take-off, showing similar accuracy. The distance between the satellite and aircraft could thus be calculated for signals exchanged between 02:25–08:19, after Flight 370 disappeared from radar. However, this could only produce a ring on Earth's surface that is equidistant from the satellite at the calculated value, adjusted to account for the aircraft flying at 10,000 metres (33,000 feet). The ring could also be reduced to an arc by taking into consideration the maximum range of the aircraft if it flew at its maximum speed.

The BTO value was added to the ground station's data set to assist in geo-locating an aircraft following the Air France Flight 447 accident in 2009 and the initial BFO analysis—relating the BFO value to the elevation angle between the aircraft and satellite—was based on methods developed during the Flight 447 investigation. The first and seventh handshakes gave anomalous results and were excluded from the initial analysis, but the issue was later resolved. The initial analysis, accurate to approximately 1°, determined that elevation angle between the aircraft and satellite at the 08:11 handshake was 40°. When this was publicly disclosed by Malaysian officials, the arc was broken into two arcs—dubbed the "northern corridor" and "southern corridor." The first and seventh handshakes were later determined to be part of a log-on sequence, as opposed to the other handshakes that were log-on interrogation messages. The bias value during the logon sequence is different and was calculated using historical data for the aircraft's SDU. This allowed the distance between the satellite and aircraft to be determined at these times.

=== Burst frequency offset ===
BFO contributing factors

While the BTO is able to determine the distance between the satellite and the aircraft at the time of each handshake, it was still necessary to determine where along the BTO arcs the aircraft was. To accomplish this, an analysis was performed on another attribute of received signals that was recorded by the ground station: the burst frequency offset (BFO)—the difference between the expected and actual frequencies of the signal received from the aircraft. The BFO is primarily caused by the Doppler shift—a shift in frequency caused by the relative movement of the aircraft, satellite, and ground station—along with several other factors which can be calculated and removed, allowing the Doppler shift between the aircraft and satellite to be isolated. The Doppler shift between the aircraft and satellite indicates the relative motion of the aircraft relative to the satellite, although multiple combinations of aircraft speed and heading exist that match a given Doppler shift value.

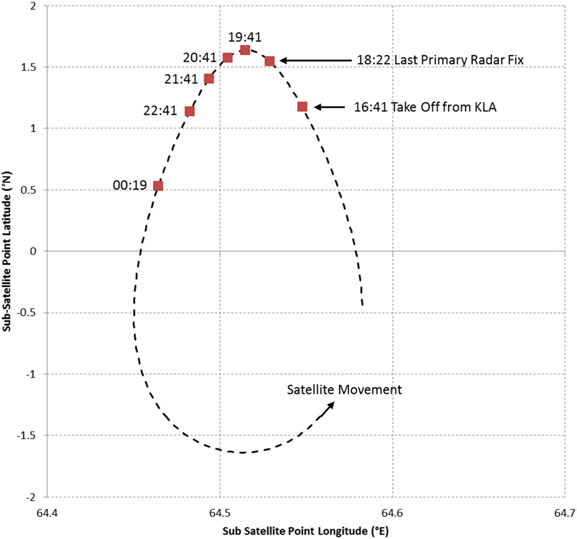
Sub-satellite points of Inmarsat-3 F1 during Flight 370 and an indication of its movement.

When the aircraft's SDU responds to messages sent from the ground station, it uses the aircraft's navigation system to determine the aircraft's position, track, and ground speed and adjusts the transmit frequency to compensate for the Doppler shift on the uplink signal, based on the satellite being located in its nominal position in geostationary orbit (35786 km above the equator) at 64.5°E. The initial analysis was calculated with the satellite at its nominal location in geostationary orbit, 35,786 km (22,236 mi) above the equator at 64.5°E longitude. However, the Inmarsat-3 F1 satellite was launched in 1996 with an expected life span of 13 years and to extend its lifespan by conserving remaining fuel, it was allowed to drift from its nominal location into a slightly inclined orbit. A map of the sub-satellite points—the location on Earth's surface directly beneath the satellite—shows that the satellite moves counterclockwise in an oval shape between 1.6°S–1.6°N and 64.45–64.58°E. As a result, the adjustments made by the SDU only partially compensate for the Doppler shift on the uplink. This error is "immaterial" to the performance of the satellite network, but was crucial to eliminate the northern corridor during the initial analysis.

As the signal passes through the satellite, it is translated by—added to—a signal generated by an oscillator in the satellite. Although the oscillator is housed in a temperature-controlled enclosure, it is subjected to thermal variation throughout the day that results in minor changes in the frequency of the translation signal. The thermal variation results from the rotation of the satellite relative to the sun over a given 24-hour period, including the time the satellite passes through the Earth's shadow (which affected the 3:40 and 4:26 handshakes), and is complicated by the use of heaters that run when the oscillator temperature exits pre-determined limits. The variation in the translation frequency was calculated over several days, including the day of Flight 370's disappearance, and could be factored into the BFO measurement.

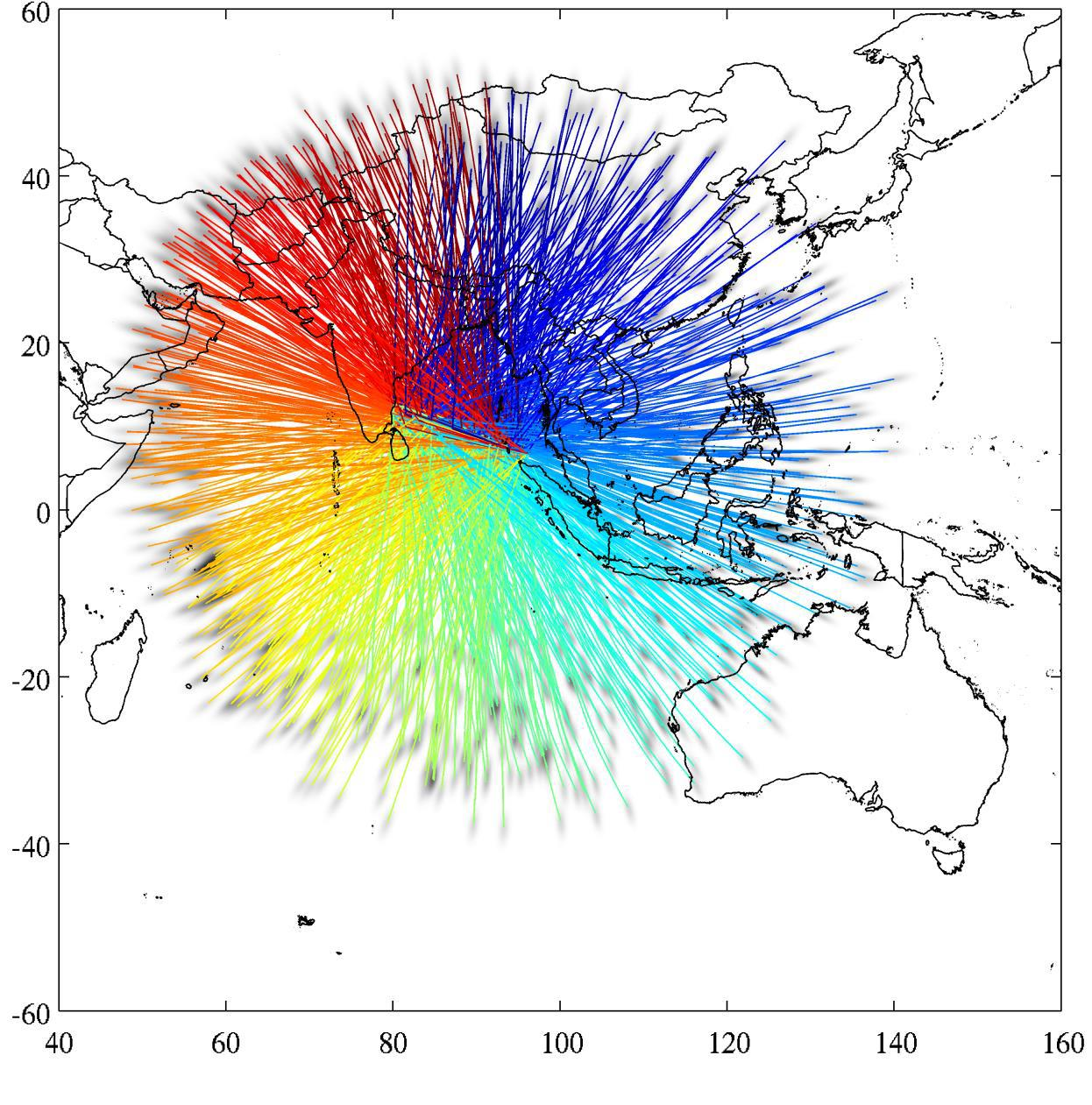
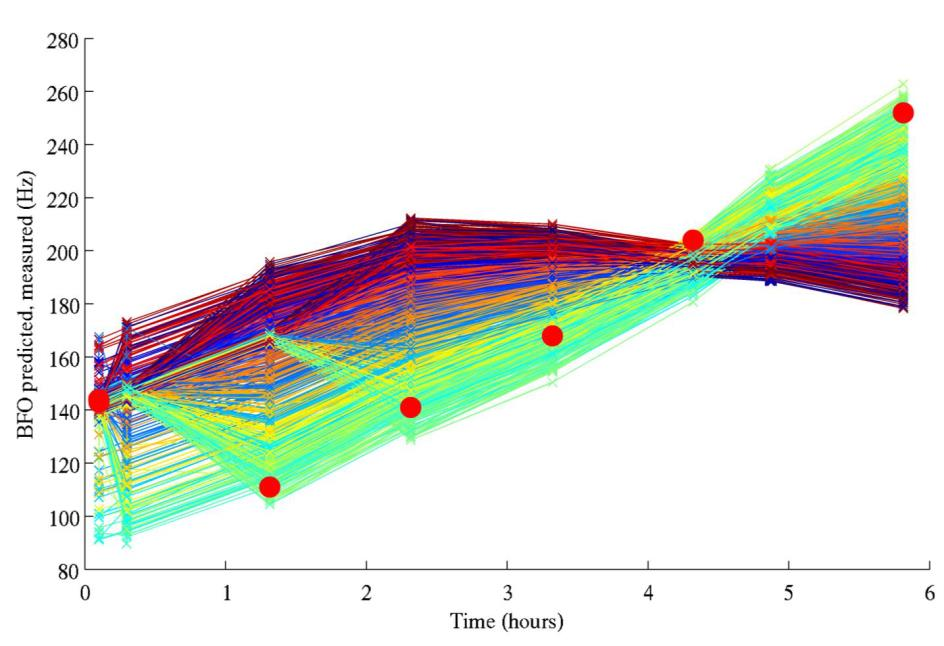
Comparison of predicted BFO values of 1000 flight paths (left) with the actual values from Flight 370 (red dots on graph, right), shows a correlation with a track south into the Indian Ocean.

Additional factors that affect the BFO are a translation made at the ground station between the reception and processing of the signal (which is monitored and can be factored in) and a fixed bias in the aircraft and satellite oscillators due to drift and ageing (which can be calibrated by measures recorded when the aircraft's location and speed were known). At 2:40 and 6:14, ground-to-aircraft phone calls were made that were unanswered by the cockpit but acknowledged by the SDU. The signals associated with these calls could not be analysed to generate a BTO value, but BFO values of these signals can be considered in the analysis with the other BTO and BFO data.

The technique used to analyse the BFO values was validated against 87 aircraft with the same SATCOM equipment operating in the region around the time of Flight 370's disappearance and against 9 previous flights operated by the same aircraft (9M-MRO). The sensitivity to error was calculated during the early phase of Flight 370 when the aircraft's location, track, and ground speed were known. This resulted in an uncertainty of ±28° heading and ±9° of latitude.

=== Combined analysis with flight dynamics ===
The BTO analysis determined the distance between the satellite and aircraft, while the BFO analysis estimated the heading and speed of the aircraft, but is sensitive to small changes in input data. To determine the final location of Flight 370, the BTO and BFO analyses were considered in combination with aircraft performance limitations, such as altitude, airspeed, and wind. The BFO analysis was able to isolate the Doppler shift between the aircraft and determine the relative motion of the aircraft to the satellite, which is reduced by the limited range of speeds at which the aircraft can fly and thus a limited set of speed/direction combinations exist that correlate with the calculated Doppler shifts.

The aircraft has three autopilot modes. The standard mode for en-route navigation is LNAV, which navigates along a great circle route between waypoints, adjusting the aircraft's heading to compensate for wind. Other modes will maintain the aircraft's heading—direction the nose is pointed (flight path will be affected by winds)—or the aircraft's track—direction the aircraft travels (flight path in a straight direction). The latter two modes are further affected by whether the aircraft used magnetic (normal reference) or true north (typically only used at high latitudes) as the reference for the autopilot. Since Flight 370 flew near waypoints VAMPI, MEKAR, NILAM, and possibly IGOGU—all along air route N571—while traversing the Malacca Strait, investigators considered whether Flight 370 followed any air routes or intersected any waypoints in the Southern Indian Ocean. Waypoints MUTMI and RUNUT were considered possible points that Flight 370 may have traversed, but tracks through these waypoints did not correlate well with paths generated from the BTO and BFO analysis.

Two analysis techniques were used to combine the BTO and BFO results with flight parameters:

- Data error optimisation – Candidate paths varied speed and heading at each handshake to minimise the error between the calculated BFO of that path versus the actual BFO recorded from Flight 370. These paths were not constrained by the behaviour of the aircraft's autopilot.
- Constrained autopilot dynamics – The aircraft is assumed to be flying under the control of one of the autopilot modes. Candidate paths were generated using each mode. BTO and BFO values of each path were calculated and compared against the recorded values from Flight 370.

Combined analysis results. Refined flight path model that defined the priority search area for the underwater phase of the search. The purple region is the maximum cruise range, based on several possible scenarios. The red lines are candidate paths generated by various autopilot modes and scenarios. Those paths were then broken into segments between each satellite transmission from the aircraft and speed to minimise the difference with the measured BFO. The overlap between the red and green lines represent the most likely flight paths of Flight 370 up to 08:19 MYT (00:19 UTC).

The top 100 constrained autopilot dynamics candidate paths were selected on the basis of their match with the satellite data from Flight 370 and their consistency with autopilot behaviour. The distribution of these paths at the intersection with the 6th handshake was then generated, with some paths outside (south) of the maximum range of the aircraft and which can therefore be eliminated. The candidate paths generated by the data error optimisation method were weighed according to the root mean square of the BFO values at each handshake. The distribution of results from these two methods were charted together, indicating that the total probability areas overlap on the 08:11 arc between approximately 35–39°S. These paths have then been extrapolated to the seventh handshake at 08:19 and constrained by the maximum range, intersecting the seventh arc between approximately 33.5–38.3°S. This is the most likely location of Flight 370 at the time of the seventh handshake.

=== Determining the final location of Flight 370 and search area ===
Knowing the location at the seventh handshake, investigators then needed to determine an appropriate width of the search area from the seventh arc. The seventh handshake was a 'log-on request' initiated by the aircraft and is believed to be the result of the SDU starting after power failure, resulting from fuel exhaustion and following the deployment of the ram air turbine and restart of the auxiliary power unit. The log-on request would have occurred 3 minutes and 40 seconds after fuel exhaustion—commonly known as flameout in aviation—of the second engine (flameout of both engines would not have occurred simultaneously), at which point the autopilot would have disengaged. The BFO value of this handshake indicates the aircraft may have been descending and the aircraft was travelling northeast to southwest.

An analysis of aircraft systems, particularly the electrical system and autopilot, are ongoing. Boeing and Malaysia Airlines have conducted numerous end-of-flight scenarios in their Boeing 777 simulators. The scenarios involve flameout in one engine before the other without any input from the cockpit. This scenario results in the aircraft entering a spiraling low-bank turn with the aircraft entering the water a relatively short distance from the last engine flameout. If control inputs were made (i.e. the plane was under the control of a pilot) and depending on the initial altitude, it is possible that the aircraft could glide over 100 nautical miles (190 km; 120 mi). However, investigators believe Flight 370 was most likely uncontrolled at this point. The ATSB cites a previous study conducted for the BEA, which determined that in cases of an upset followed by loss of control all impact points were within 20 nmi (37 km; 23 mi) of the start of the emergency, and in most cases within 10 nmi (19 km; 12 mi). Based on this, the ATSB chose a 50 nmi (93 km; 58 mi) width—20 nmi (37 km; 23 mi) to the west and 30 nmi (56 km; 35 mi) to the east of the arc—for the underwater search in June 2014. While keeping the 50 nmi width for the priority search area, the ATSB determined that the aircraft most likely entered the ocean close to the seventh arc and the underwater search would be conducted from the seventh arc and progress outwards.

== Other analyses ==
In the weeks after Flight 370's disappearance, discussions concerning the analysis of satellite data began on the website of space scientist Duncan Steel. The informal group of people, most with scientific backgrounds, soon became known as the Independent Group (IG) and has worked to analyse possible flight paths to determine the most likely final location of Flight 370. For the first few months, their efforts were hindered by a lack of data publicly released and they were critical of the official analysis by Inmarsat; the IG also pressured officials to release data related to Flight 370's satellite communications. The IG did not believe there was sufficient evidence, using publicly available information, to exclude the possibility of Flight 370 following a northern track prior to the release of the communication logs on 27 May. Some of the IG members have worked on analysing specific elements of Flight 370's flight path, such as the mid-flight speed of Flight 370 and precise location of the Inmarsat-3 F1 satellite.

On 17 June, before the 26 June release of a report by the Australian Transport Safety Bureau (ATSB) detailing the analysis of the satellite communications, the IG released a statement that they believed the final location of Flight 370 is 36.02°S 88.57°E at the time of the 6th handshake, which was used because the seventh handshake was not well understood at the time. Their evaluation published in July 2015 of the final location of Flight 370 is 37.105°S 89.871°E.

In May 2021, aerospace engineer Richard Godfrey and member of the Independent Group of Scientist suggested that weak signal propagation (WSPR) technology could be used to track the flightpath of the aircraft. In November 2021, he reported that his analysis using WSPR technology indicated the aircraft flew in circles for around 22 minutes in an area 150 nautical miles from the coast of Sumatra, and later that month he announced a crash area with a radius of 40.0 nautical miles (74.1 km) centred around 33.177°S 95.300°E. As Godfrey's area also covers part of the ocean surveyed during the initial search, the Australian Transport Safety Bureau asked in February 2022 to review the data from the initial search in order "to re-validate that no items of interest were detected in that area". However, Victor Iannello of the same Independent Group as Godfrey claims that WSPR can't find MH370 because signals scattered by aircraft are orders of magnitude too weak to be detected and decoded.

Another analysis was made by Simon Hardy, a Boeing 777 captain, and published in March 2015. Hardy's analysis is a mathematical model to determine the track of Flight 370 from the 4th to 6th handshakes, assuming that the aircraft's track and speed would be constant during this period of the flight. He calculated that the aircraft was likely flying on a 188° magnetic track, which the aircraft would compensate for winds to continue in a straight line, and that the final location of Flight 370 is near 38.082°S 87.400°E.

== Timeline ==
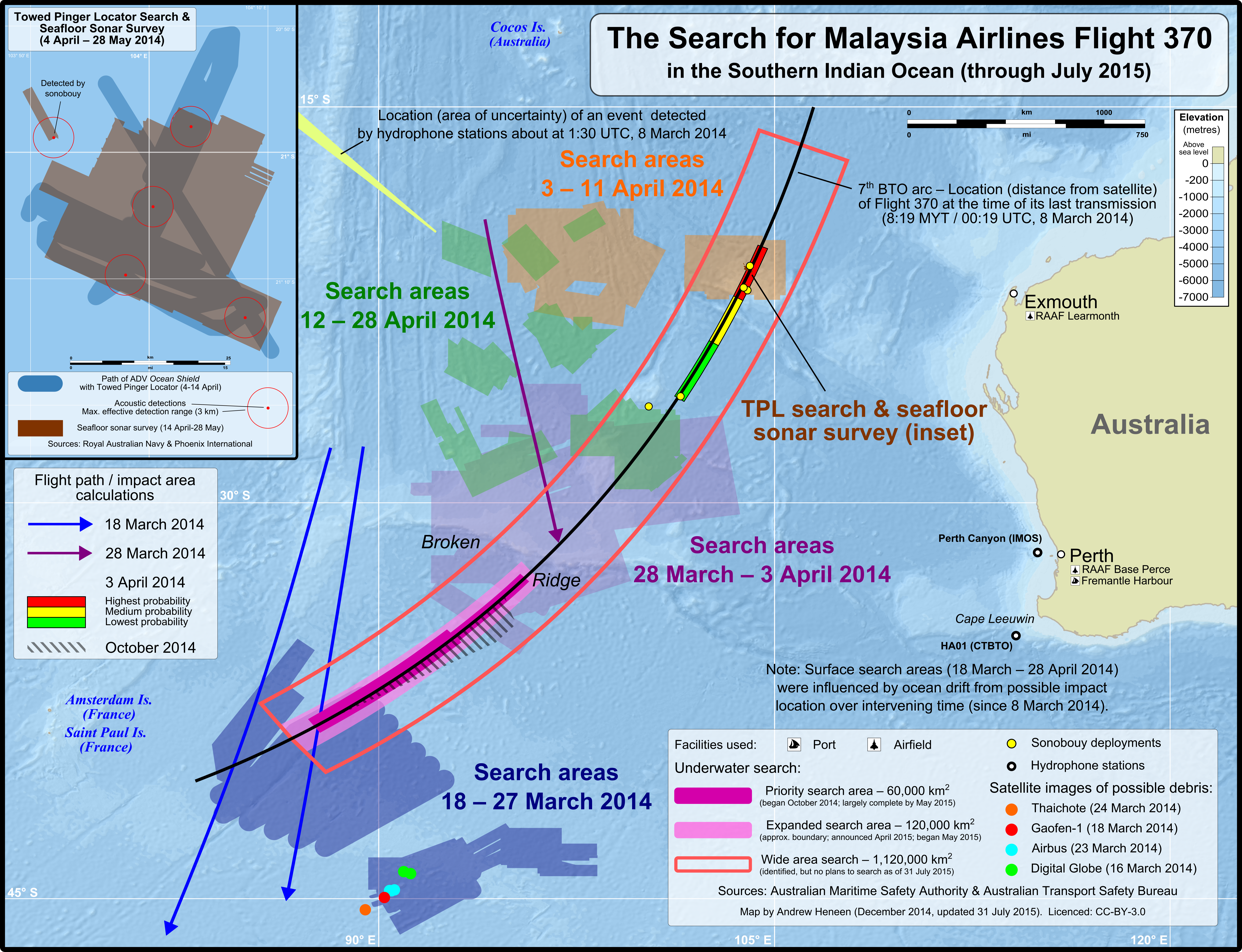
The search zones for Flight 370 in the Southern Indian Ocean. The legend on the left includes the shifting flight path calculations, based on analysis of Flight 370's communications with Inmarsat-3 F1.

On 8 March, Inmarsat provided basic flight data relating to Flight 370 to SITA, which relayed information to Malaysia Airlines and investigators. On 9–10 March, Inmarsat engineers noted that the ground station log recorded pings from the aircraft for several hours after contact was lost with air traffic control. Malaysian investigators set up an international working group, consisting of various agencies with experience in aircraft performance and satellite communications, to further analyse the signals between Flight 370 and the ground station, especially the signal at 08:19. These included representatives from the UK's Inmarsat, AAIB, and Rolls-Royce; China's Civil Aviation Administration and Aircraft Accident Investigation Department; the US NTSB and FAA; and Malaysian authorities.

An analysis of the time difference between the transmission of the ping and the aircraft's response allowed Inmarsat to determine the aircraft's distance from the satellite. This resulted in two arcs—referred to as the "northern corridor" and "southern corridor"—where the aircraft may have been located at the time of its last complete handshake at 08:11. Using an "innovative technique" that has "never before [been] used in an investigation of this sort", the team determined it could also use the burst frequency offset to determine the aircraft's speed and position along the identified arcs. Inmarsat cross-checked its methodology to known flight data from six Boeing 777 aircraft flying in various directions on the same day, and found a good match. Applying the technique to the handshake signals from Flight 370 gave results that correlated strongly with the expected and actual measurements of a southern trajectory over the Indian Ocean, but poorly with a northern trajectory. Further revised calculations to account for movements of the satellite relative to the earth allowed the northern corridor to be ruled out completely. This analysis was passed on to Malaysian authorities on 23 March.

At 22:00 local time the next day, 24 March, Prime Minister Najib cited this development concluding at a press conference that Flight 370 ended in the southern Indian Ocean.

Using a type of analysis never before used in an investigation of this sort... Inmarsat and the AAIB have concluded that [Flight 370] flew along the southern corridor, and that its last position was in the middle of the Indian Ocean, west of Perth. This is a remote location, far from any possible landing sites. It is therefore with deep sadness and regret that I must inform you that, according to this new data, [Flight 370] ended in the southern Indian Ocean.

— Malaysian Prime Minister Najib Razak (24 March 2014)

In an article published on 8 May several satellite experts questioned the analysis of satellite pings made by Inmarsat staff because the Doppler frequency shifts measured were apparently not properly corrected against the satellite's own drift (a periodic north–south oscillation of 3° every 24 hours). Without any additional data being released, the implication of this new analysis was that the northern portion of the Inmarsat satellite pings arc could not be ruled out. The Malaysian government released the satellite data three weeks later.

Details of the methodology used to analyse the satellite communications were provided in the Australian Transport Safety Bureau's report MH370 – Definition of Underwater Search Areas, published in June, and a supplement released in October.

A peer-reviewed paper by Inmarsat scientists published in the Journal of Navigation in October 2014 provides an account of the analysis applied to the satellite communications from Flight 370. Their analysis concluded that Flight 370 was near 34.7°S 93.0°E when the final transmission from the aircraft was made, but in their conclusion they "[stress] that the sensitivity of the reconstructed flight path to frequency errors is such that there remains significant uncertainty in the final location." Their analysis used a simplified model of the aircraft's flight dynamics "to illustrate how the measurements may be transformed into a reasonable flight path" and note that other investigators used more sophisticated models to determine the underwater search area. Although access to the journal requires a subscription, its publishers "[felt] this paper and subject are too important, and that it should be shared with the world" and the paper was released as an Open Access article with a Creative Commons Attribution license.

Since the October reports, analysis of the satellite data has continued to be refined. In March 2015, ATSB Chief Commissioner Mark Dolan remarked that he is "slightly more optimistic than six months ago, because we have more confidence in the data".

On 29 July 2015, a flaperon from Flight 370 was discovered on Reunion Island. The ATSB reviewed their drift calculations for debris from the aircraft and, according to the JACC, they are "satisfied that the discovery of the flaperon at La Réunion...is consistent with the current underwater search area in the southern Indian Ocean." Reverse drift modelling of the debris, to determine its origin after 16 months, also supports the current underwater search area, although reverse drift modelling is very imprecise over long periods of time.
