= Underwater locator beacon =

Device fitted to aviation flight recorders

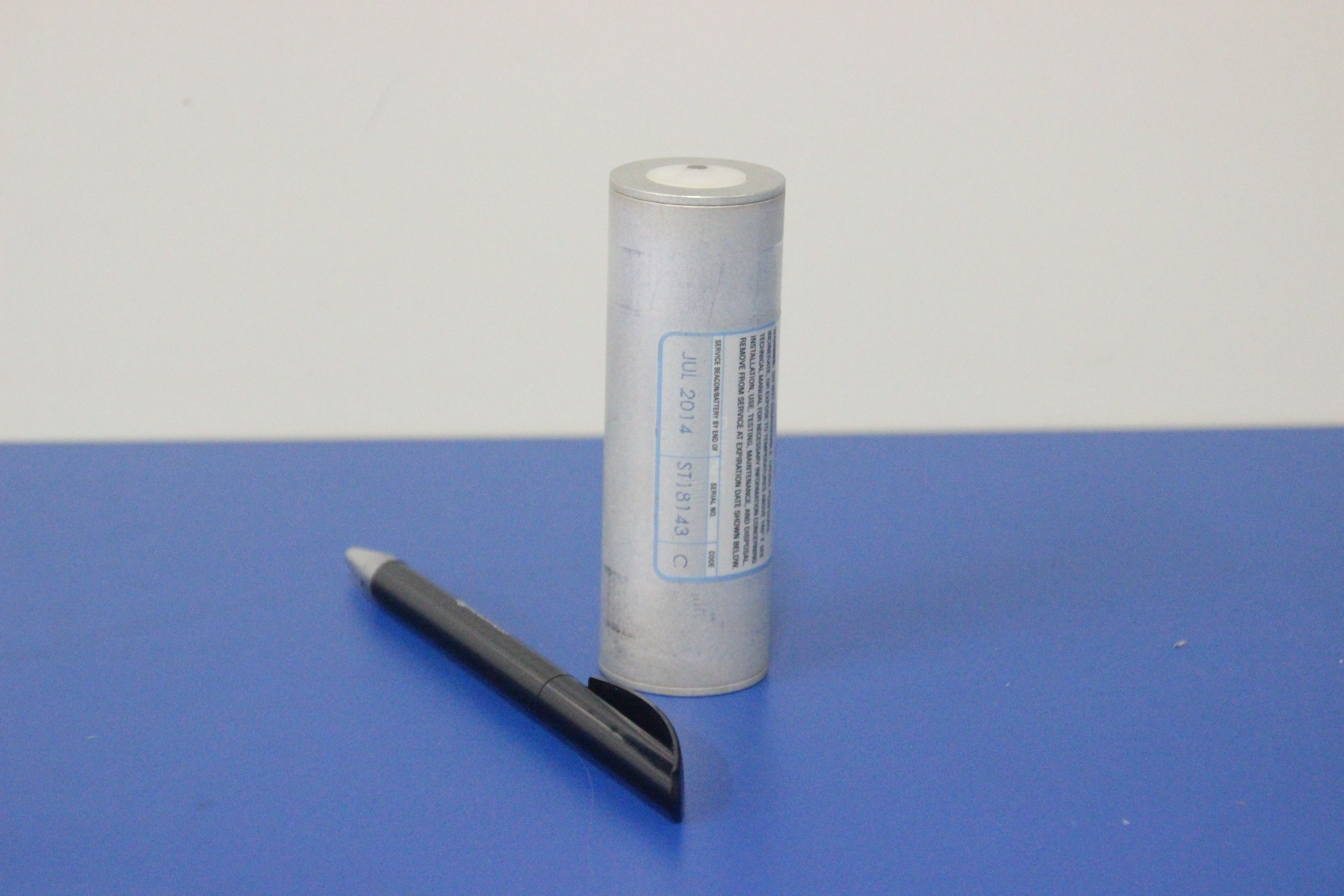
A 4-inch (100 mm) underwater locator beacon, with ballpoint pen for scale

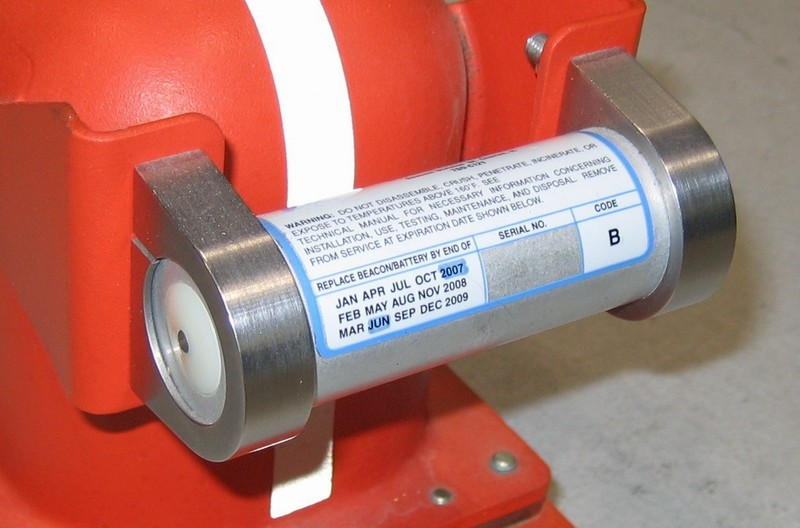
A ULB attached to a bracket on a cockpit voice recorder

An underwater locator beacon (ULB), underwater locating device (ULD), or underwater acoustic beacon is a device that emits an acoustic pulse intended to guide searchers equipped with a suitable receiver to the location of the beacon underwater.

== Application ==
An underwater locator beacon is fitted to aviation flight recorders such as the cockpit voice recorder (CVR) and flight data recorder (FDR). ULBs are also sometimes required to be attached directly to an aircraft fuselage. These ULBs are triggered by water immersion; most emit an ultrasonic 10 ms pulse once per second at 37.5 kHz ± 1 kHz.

Research by the French Bureau d'Enquêtes et d'Analyses pour la Sécurité de l'Aviation Civile (BEA) has shown that it has had a 90% survival rate spanning 27 air accidents over the sea. The ULBs fitted in Air France Flight 447, which crashed on 1 June 2009, were certified to transmit at 37.5 kHz for a minimum of 30 days at a temperature of 4 °C. After investigating the crash, the BEA recommended that FDR ULBs' transmission period be increased to 90 days and for "airplanes performing public transport flights over maritime areas to be equipped with an additional ULB capable of transmitting on a frequency (for example between 8.5 kHz and 9.5 kHz) and for a duration adapted to the pre-localisation of wreckage" (i.e. with increased range).

On ships built on or after 1 July 2014, underwater locating devices must ensure a regulatory transmission time of at least 90 days.

The European Union Aviation Safety Agency requires since 1 January 2019 for most large aeroplanes operated over routes that go farther than 180 nautical miles (330 km; 210 mi) from a shore to be equipped with an additional ULB emitting at 8.8 KHz. It also requires since 1 January 2020 that the transmission time be increased to 90 days.

== Power source and activation ==
A beacon is typically supplied with electrical power by a lithium battery, which needs to be replaced after several years. Once the beacon becomes immersed in water, a built-in "water switch" activates it via the water's presence completing an electrical circuit, and the beacon starts emitting its "pings"; the battery power should be sufficient for 30 to 40 days after the activation. The minimum battery voltage is 2.97 volts and the maximum is 3.5 volts.

The National Transportation Safety Board reported a case in 1988, involving an Aerospatiale AS-355F-1 helicopter, when the water switch had accidentally activated during the aircraft's normal operation; as a result, the battery power had been exhausted by the time the accident happened, and the beacon was not emitting the acoustic signal when it needed to do so.

== Maximum detection range ==
A 37.5 kHz (SPL of 160.5 dB re 1 μPa) pinger can be detectable from the surface from a distance of 1–2 kilometres (0.62–1.24 mi) in normal conditions and 4–5 kilometres (2.5–3.1 mi) under ideal conditions.

A 8.8 KHz pinger can be detectable from a distance of 13–22 kilometres (8.1–13.7 mi) or four times the distance of standard ULBs.

== See also ==
- SOFAR bomb
- Towed pinger locator
- Underwater acoustics
- Sonar
- Emergency locator beacon
