= Towed pinger locator =

Sonar location system

How a towed pinger locator is deployed

A towed pinger locator is a water-borne device used to locate the sonar "ping" from the underwater locator beacon which is fitted to the Cockpit Voice Recorders and Flight Data Recorders installed in commercial airliners. They can locate pingers at depths of up to 20,000 feet (6,100 m) underwater.

== Description ==
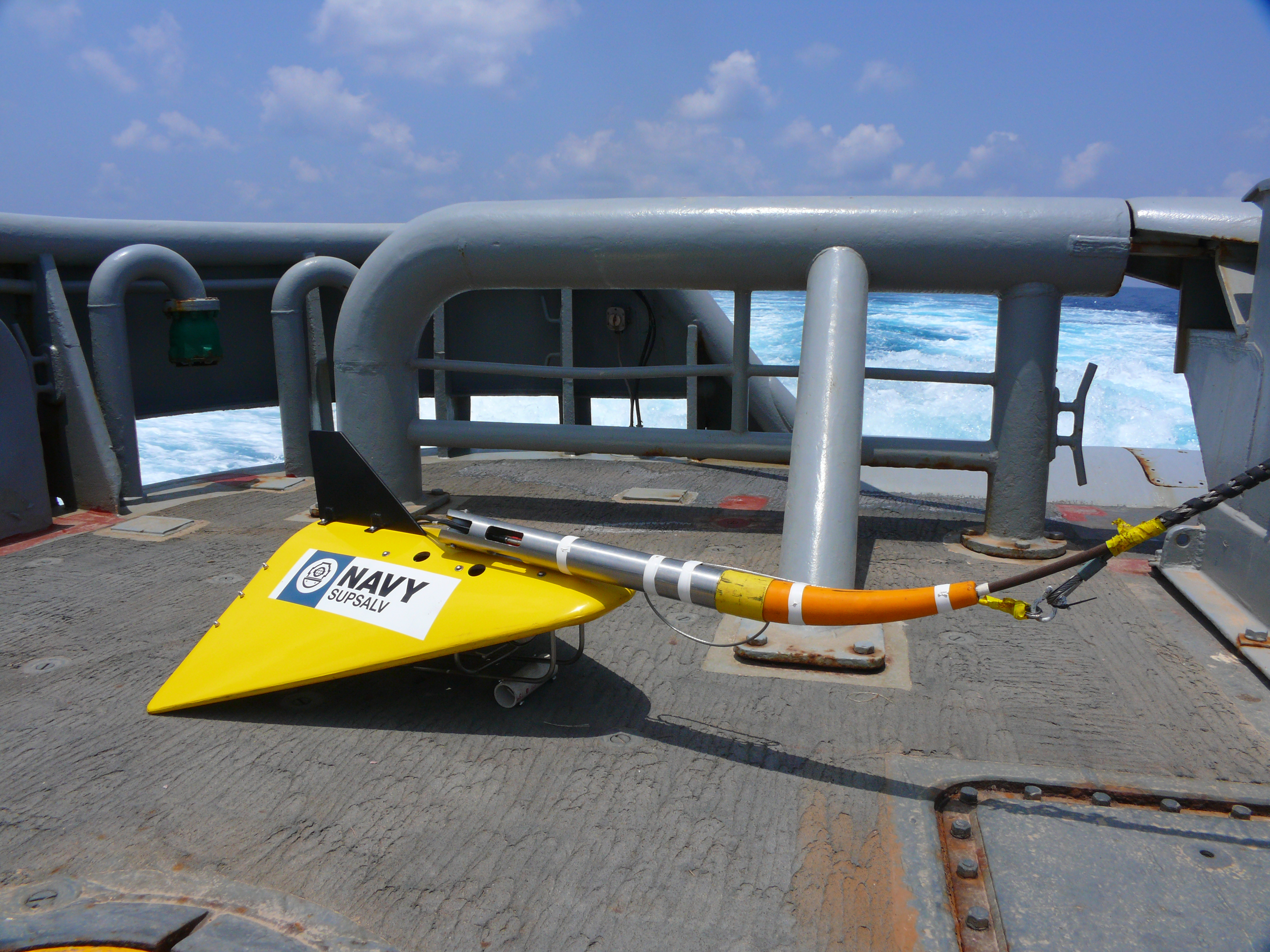
United States Navy Towed Pinger Locator 25 system

The locator is mounted in a hydrodynamic shell, or "tow fish", connected by winch behind a surface vessel across the search area. The locator listens for the sound emanating from the beacon or "pinger". Once located, the beacon and its attached recorders can be retrieved by divers, submersibles or remotely operated vehicle (ROV), depending on depth. A model currently used by the United States Navy is the TPL-25, which has a weight of 70 pounds (32 kg) and a length of 30 inches (760 mm); it is generally towed at 1–5 knots (2–9 km/h).

Most beacons transmit a pulse once a second at 37.5 kHz.

The hydrophone must be positioned below the thermocline layer which reflects sounds, either back to the surface or back to the ocean floor. Since the pinger signal is relatively weak, the hydrophone must be within a nautical mile (about 6,080 feet (1,850 m)) to detect it. The hydrophone is typically deployed about 1,000 feet (300 m) above the ocean floor, where it can scan a swath approximately 12,000 feet (3,700 m) wide, on a flat, level surface.

== See also ==
- Flight recorder
- Emergency position-indicating radiobeacon station (ELTs)
- Air France Flight 447
- Korean Air Lines Flight 007
- List of unrecovered flight recorders
- Malaysia Airlines Flight 370
- Towed array sonar
