= Satellite data unit =

Avionics device for satellite communication

A satellite data unit (SDU) is an avionics device installed in an aircraft that allows air/ground communication via a satellite network. It is an integral part of an aircraft's SATCOM (satellite communication) system. The device connects with a satellite via ordinary radio frequency (RF) communication and the satellite then connects to a ground station or vice versa. All satellite communication whether audio or data is processed by the SDU.

The SDU communicates with an onboard MDDU (multi-purpose disk-drive unit) which maintains an updatable table of ground stations near the aircraft's position and the order of preference for selection of which ground station to use which thus guides the choice of satellite. Along with analysing data continuously sent from all ground stations (such as station status and the error rate of signals from each station) the SDU receives information on the aircraft's position and orientation from another onboard system (ADIRU, air data inertial reference unit) which it passes to the BSU (beam-steering unit) to direct the signal beam from the aircraft to the chosen satellite.

With the advent of cellphones and the Internet a separate or integrated SDU can be used to offer telephone and Internet services to passengers.

Logs of satellite communication have been used to inform search and rescue agencies of locations of missing aircraft, like Malaysia Airlines Flight 370 whose position was unknown due to loss of radar contact and other communications. Automated SATCOM transmissions suggested it flew about 1,600 km (1,000 mi) off its designated flight path having flown approximately south-southwest rather than the intended approximately north-northeast.

== See also ==
- Avionics
- Satellite communications
- Satellite network
- Air data inertial reference unit
- Beam steering
- Search and rescue
- Malaysia Airlines Flight 370
