= HMAS AE1 =

E-class submarine of the Royal Australian Navy

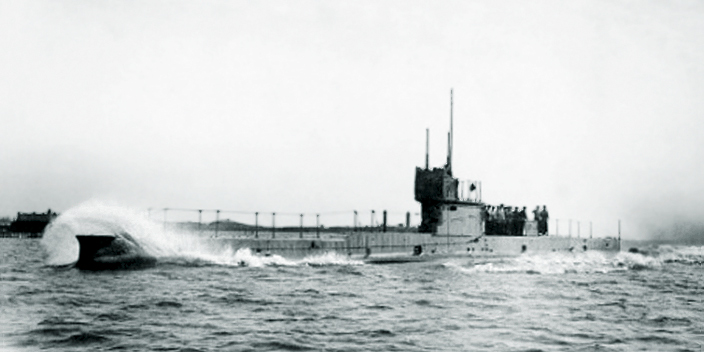
- HMAS AE1 underway in 1914

History

Australia
- Builder: Vickers Limited
- Laid down: 14 November 1911
- Launched: 22 May 1913
- Commissioned: 28 February 1914
- Nickname(s): AE1
- Honours and awards: Battle honours: Rabaul 1914
- Fate: Lost at sea, 14 September 1914
- Notes: Wreck located at a depth of 300 metres off the Duke of York Islands

General characteristics
- Class & type: E-class submarine
- Displacement: 750 long tons (762 t) surfaced
- Length: 181 ft (55 m)
- Beam: 22 ft 6 in (6.86 m)
- Draught: 12 ft 6 in (3.81 m)
- Installed power: 2 × 8-cylinder diesels, 1,600 hp (1,200 kW) surfaced, battery-driven electric motors, 840 hp (630 kW) submerged
- Propulsion: 2 × propeller shafts
- Speed: 15 knots (28 km/h; 17 mph) surfaced; 10 knots (19 km/h; 12 mph) submerged
- Range: 3,000 nmi (5,600 km; 3,500 mi) at 10 knots (19 km/h; 12 mph) surfaced; 65 nmi (120 km; 75 mi) at 5 knots (9.3 km/h; 5.8 mph) submerged
- Test depth: 200 feet (61.0 m)
- Complement: 34
- Armament: 4 × 18-inch torpedo tubes

HMAS AE1 was an E-class submarine of the Royal Australian Navy (RAN). She was the first submarine to serve in the RAN, and sank with all hands near what is now East New Britain, Papua New Guinea, on 14 September 1914, after less than seven months in service. Search missions attempting to locate the wreck began in 1976. The submarine was found during the 13th search mission near the Duke of York Islands in December 2017.

== Design and construction ==
The E class was a version of the preceding D-class submarine enlarged to accommodate an additional pair of broadside torpedo tubes. AE1 was 181 feet (55.2 m) long overall, with a beam of 22 feet 6 inches (6.9 m) and a draught of 12 feet 6 inches (3.8 m). She displaced 750 long tons (762 t) on the surface and 810 long tons (823 t) submerged. The E-class boats had a designed diving depth of 100 feet (30.5 m), but the addition of watertight bulkheads strengthened the hull and increased the actual diving depth to 200 feet (61.0 m). The complement consisted of 34 men: officers and ratings.

The boat had two propellers, each of which was driven by an eight-cylinder, 800-brake-horsepower (600 kW) diesel engine as well as a 420-brake-horsepower (313 kW) electric motor. This arrangement gave the E-class submarines a maximum speed of 15 knots (28 km/h; 17 mph) while surfaced and 10 knots (19 km/h; 12 mph) when submerged. They carried approximately 40 long tons (41 t) of fuel oil, which provided a range of 3,000 nautical miles (5,600 km; 3,500 mi) at 10 knots (19 km/h; 12 mph) while on the surface and 65 nmi (120 km; 75 mi) at 5 knots (9.3 km/h; 5.8 mph) while submerged. AE1 had four 18-inch (460 mm) torpedo tubes, one each in the bow and stern, plus two on the broadside, one firing to port and the other to starboard. The boat carried one spare torpedo for each tube. No guns were fitted.

In February 1911, defence minister George Pearce announced that orders had been placed with Vickers Limited for two submarines. AE1 was built at Barrow-in-Furness, England, having been laid down on 14 November 1911 and launched on 22 May 1913 and commissioned into the RAN on 28 February 1914. After commissioning, AE1, accompanied by AE2, the other of the RAN's first two submarines, reached Sydney from England on 24 May 1914. Officers for the submarines were Royal Navy (RN) personnel, while the ratings were a mix of sailors drawn from the RN and RAN.

== Deployment and loss ==
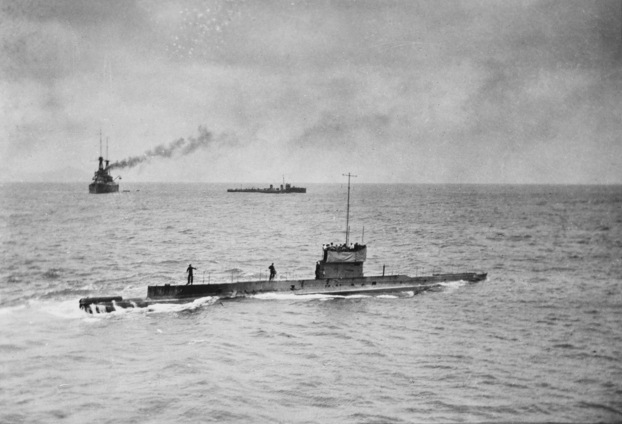
AE1 with other Australian vessels off Rabaul on 9 September 1914

At the outbreak of World War I, AE1, commanded by Lieutenant Commander Thomas Besant, was part of the Australian Naval and Military Expeditionary Force sent to attack German New Guinea. Along with AE2, she took part in the operations leading to the occupation of the German territory, including the surrender of Rabaul on 13 September 1914. The submarine's involvement was recognised in 2010, following an overhaul of the RAN battle honours system, with the retroactive award of the honour "Rabaul 1914".

At 07:00 on 14 September, AE1 departed Blanche Bay, Rabaul, to patrol off Cape Gazelle with HMAS Parramatta. When she had not returned by 20:00, several ships were dispatched to search for her. No trace of the submarine was found, and she was listed as lost with all hands. The disappearance was Australia's first major loss of World War I.

After the discovery of the submarine in December 2017, Rear Admiral Peter Briggs, retired, said the likely cause of its loss was a diving accident. He added:

The submarine appears to have struck the bottom with sufficient force to dislodge the fin from its footing, forcing it to hinge forward on its leading edge, impacting the casing.

As of April 2018, the best-supported theory for the submarine's loss was that it went below its crush depth due to a mechanical failure. Later that year, a team of researchers headed by the National Maritime Museum director Kevin Sumption concluded their investigation into the sinking of AE1. They concluded that a ventilation valve, which was likely open to make the tropical conditions a little more bearable while the submarine was cruising on the surface near the Duke of York Islands, was insecure when the submarine dived, causing flooding of the submarine's engine room and total loss of control of the AE1. The submarine subsequently sank below 100 metres and imploded, killing everyone on board instantly.

== Searches for wreck ==
Beyond the search immediately after the submarine's disappearance, there were no concentrated efforts to locate the wreck of AE1 for the next 60 years, until the 1970s, when John Foster, a RAN officer working in Port Moresby, became interested in the story. After researching wartime records, Foster persuaded the RAN to deploy the survey ship HMAS Flinders in 1976. Flinders found one potential sonar contact, but did not have a sophisticated enough side-scan sonar to make a determination either way. During a deployment to Papua New Guinea in 1978, Flinders conducted several ad-hoc searches, again with no useful result. In 1990, while sailing between New Britain and New Ireland, Jacques Cousteau diverted his ship, Calypso, to investigate the potential contact found in 1976. His original plan was to investigate up close with a submersible, but mechanical issues prevented it, and Calypso instead performed a magnetometer search of the area, finding no wrecks.

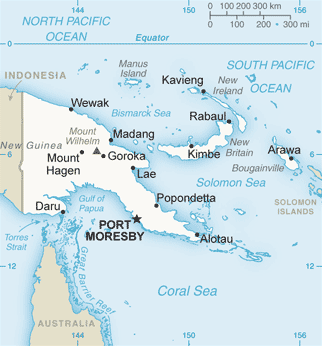
Map of the region where AE1 was lost in September 1914

Foster had continued archive research into AE1's disappearance, supplemented with visits to Rabaul and nearby islands to see if references to the submarine appeared in any community's oral histories. By 2002, he was focused on the waters off Mioko Island in the Duke of York Islands group: a priest from a Catholic mission had stated that members of the community had spotted a wrecked submarine on Wirian Reef while diving for shells. Attempts to dive the reported site of the wreck in 2002 and early 2003 were unsuccessful: the former was called off due to high shark presence, the latter expedition also was hampered by shark activity and found no wreck at the reported location. A third expedition in November 2003, supported by the Maritime Museum of Western Australia and the Australian Broadcasting Corporation, conducted searches off Mioko and nearby islands, again with no success. Further oral evidence supporting the wreck of AE1 being off Mioko was learned during one of the 2003 expeditions: Foster discovered that the Tolai people had a legend of a "devil fish" appearing offshore on the day that AE1 disappeared.

In February 2007, a new effort to locate the submarine was mounted by the RAN, when the survey ships Benalla and Shepparton attempted to locate the submarine off East New Britain. Benalla located an object on Wirian Reef of the appropriate dimensions using sonar on 1 March, but was unable to verify the nature of the object due to a damaged magnetometer. The minehunter HMAS Yarra was sent to investigate the object further in late 2007. Sonar and remotely-operated vehicle (ROV) imagery of the object revealed shape and dimensions similar to the submarine, but subsequent analysis by the Defence Science and Technology Organisation identified the object as a rock formation.

Foster organised another search in May 2009, partially funded by Channel Seven's Sunday Night, based on claims by a Rabaul-based salvage diver that he had seen the wreck in Simpson Harbour back in 1971, in proximity to the wreck of the Japanese merchant ship Keifuku Maru. Diver searches of the site specified by the salvager failed to find either wreck. A follow-up search later that year by the Western Australian Maritime Museum found that Keifuku Maru had been buried under 30 metres (98 ft) of rock during the 1994 Rabaul caldera eruption, but found no evidence of AE1, buried or otherwise. John Foster died in 2010 with the search for AE1 continued by others. During early 2012, the minehunter HMAS Gascoyne and the survey ship HMNZS Resolution detected a potential wrecked submarine in Simpson Harbour. Although initially suspected to be AE1, the wreck was determined to be a World War II-era Japanese midget submarine. Resolution later conducted sonar surveys of areas in which AE1 may have been lost, with no wrecks found.

Between 6 and 9 September 2014, Yarra conducted searches around the Duke of York Islands, prior to a memorial service for the centenary of the submarine's disappearance. Although numerous sonar "contacts of interest" were made during the search, including one which was singled out for further investigation, all were found to be natural terrain.

In September 2015, plans for a new search were announced by Find AE1 Limited. The search off Mioko Island was carried out in November, and was conducted by a mining survey ship towing a multibeam echosounder array. At the time of the search, Find AE1 stated that if the attempt was unsuccessful, they planned to petition the Australian government to bring in the search equipment used during the search for Malaysia Airlines Flight 370. The 2015 search was ultimately unsuccessful.

In December 2017, AE1 was located off the Duke of York Islands, which lie in the channel between New Britain and New Ireland.

Several factors have been identified as having hampered the efforts to find AE1. The volcanic nature of the region resulted in a rugged and highly variable underwater topography, with a high frequency of wreck-like acoustic anomalies. Much of the region is deep water, which limited the techniques and tools that could be used to locate and verify the wreck. Volcanic activity was also identified as a factor, due to the disruption it causes to local magnetic fields, affecting the operations of magnetometers. There were concerns that eruptions and underwater earthquakes may have caused the underwater landscape to change, or break up or bury the wreck. Additionally, the search areas contained large numbers of shipwrecks due to heavy military activity around New Guinea during World War II, along with the disposal of ships in later years.

=== Discovery ===
In December 2017, another search—the 13th—was conducted using the Dutch survey ship Fugro Equator, off the Duke of York Islands. This expedition was funded by the Commonwealth Government and the Silentworld Foundation with additional assistance from the Submarine Institute of Australia and the Australian National Maritime Museum. As a result of this effort, the submarine was found at a depth of 300 metres (980 ft) and was seen to be well preserved and in one piece. RV Petrel was enlisted to survey the wreckage, where it was discovered that the submarine's ventilation shaft is approximately 60% open, indicating that the most likely explanation for AE1's sinking is flooding with a subsequent implosion below crush depth. Further, both the stern and bow "caps" (outer coverings of the torpedo tubes) are at least partially open, suggesting that AE1 was prepared for combat. The exact location of the wreck was not announced by the Australian government at the time of discovery, in order to protect it from "unauthorised salvage attempts." The government's stated position is that the wreck will be treated as a war grave.

== Memorials ==
In 1933, a stained-glass window commemorating the losses of AE1 and AE2 was added to the naval chapel at Garden Island in Sydney. In September 2015, a floating sculpture to commemorate AE1 was unveiled outside the Australian National Maritime Museum. The sculpture takes the form of a stainless steel wreath, 6 metres (20 ft) in diameter, which projects patterns of light onto the water at night. In 2008 a memorial plaque was dedicated to HMAS AE1 at the Tasmanian Seafarers' Memorial at Triabunna on the east coast of Tasmania, commemorating the loss of L.S. Cyril Lefroy Baker RAN, Telegraphist, the first Tasmanian killed in his country's service in World War I.
