= MV Fugro Commander =

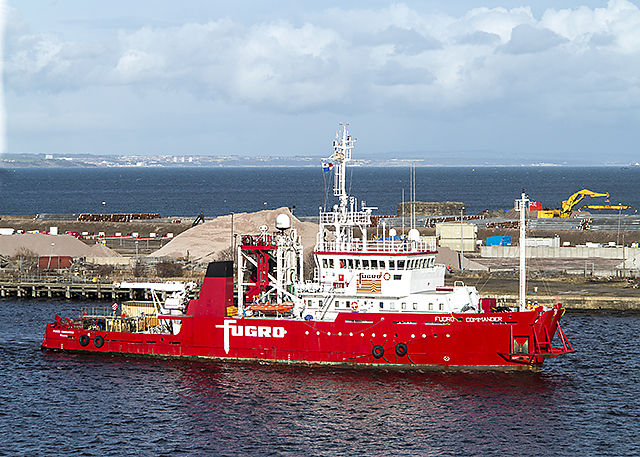
- Fugro Commander in Leith

History
- Name: 1982-2003: Mitra; 2003-2007: Multraship Commander; 2007-2015: Fugro Commander; 2016-present: Glomar Vantage
- Owner: 1982-2004: Netherlands Government; 2004-2007: Multraship Towage & Salvage BV; 2007-2015: Fugro Commander Inc; 2015-present: Seaspan Support BV
- Operator: 1982-2003: Rijkswaterstraat BV; 2003-2007: Multraship Towage; 2007-2015: Fugro; 2015-present: GloMar Shipmanagement BV
- Port of registry: 2005-2007:Netherlands; 2007-Present:Panama
- Builder: Damen Shipyard Bergum BV
- Yard number: 4608
- Launched: 3 March 1982
- Completed: 2 July 1982
- Identification: IMO number: 8109266; Call sign: HO3057; MMSI number: 372867000
- Status: In Service

General characteristics
- Type: Survey vessel
- Tonnage: 991 GT
- Length: 56.3 m (184.7 ft)
- Beam: 11.8 m (38.7 ft)
- Draught: 3.6 m (11.8 ft)
- Depth: 5.0 m (16.4 ft)
- Installed power: 786 kW
- Propulsion: 2 x Stork-Werkspoor diesel engines
- Speed: 12 kn (22.2 km/h; 13.8 mph) (Maximum)

MV Glomar Vantage is a survey vessel owned and operated by GloMar based in Den Helder, Holland to provide a range of offshore survey capabilities. Until 2015, she was known as Fugro Commander and was owned by Fugro NV and operated by their offshore subsidiary, Fugro Alluvial.
