= MV Fugro Equator =

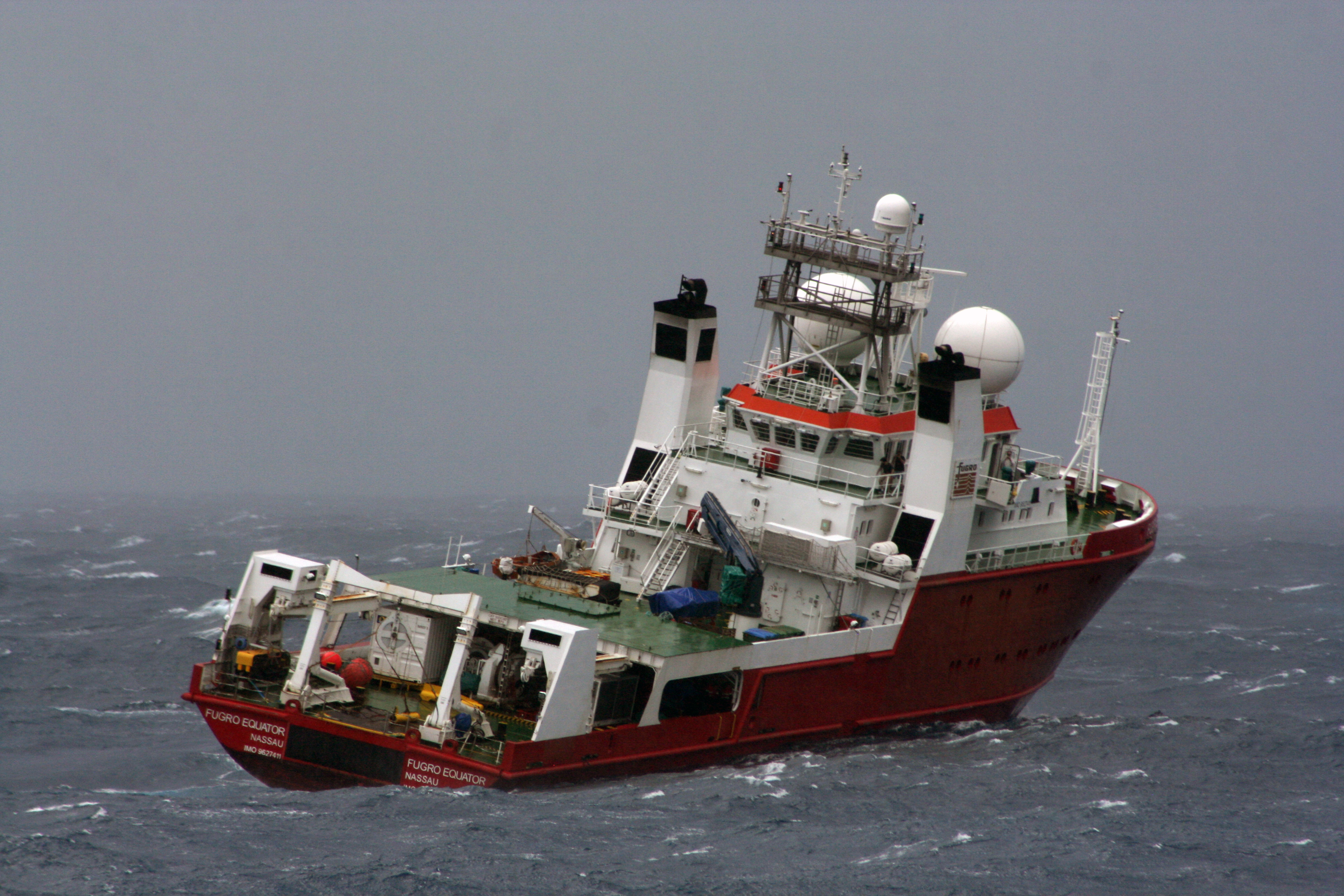
- The Fugro Equator in the Southern Indian Ocean during the search for Malaysia Airlines Flight 370
- Name: MV Fugro Equator
- Owner: Fugro Equator Inc.
- Operator: Fugro Survey Pte Ltd
- Port of registry: Nassau, Bahamas
- Launched: 30 May 2011
- Completed: 2012
- In service: 27 July 2012
- Identification: Call sign: C6ZT5; IMO number: 9627411; MMSI number: 311065700
- Status: In active service

General characteristics
- Type: Survey vessel
- Tonnage: 1,917 GT
- Length: 65.65 m
- Beam: 14.0 m
- Draught: 4.20 m
- Installed power: 3x910 kW diesel generators
- Propulsion: 2 × 1100 kW rudder propellers (electric); 400 kW bow thruster (electric)
- Speed: 12.5 knots (max cruising)
- Capacity: 42 persons

MV Fugro Equator is a survey vessel owned and operated by Dutch company Fugro to provide a range of offshore survey capabilities.

== History ==
Fugro took delivery of the ship on 27 July 2012. She is the third specially designed, dedicated survey vessel delivered to Fugro and was planned to serve in the Asia-Pacific region.

The ship was contracted to conduct a bathymetric survey in the southern Indian Ocean during the search for Malaysia Airlines Flight 370. The survey was needed to produce a bathymetric map of the sea floor of the search area, which was previously poorly mapped and largely uncharted and mountainous, before a phase of the search using a towed side-scan sonar vehicle and autonomous underwater vehicles which need to operate close to the seafloor. In August 2017, it was announced that Fugro had been awarded the contract for that phase of the search and that Fugro Equator and sister ship Fugro Discovery would conduct the search (with some assistance from Malaysian & Chinese naval vessels).

In December 2017, AE1 was located off the Duke of York Islands by MV Fugro Equator.

In December 2017, Fugro Equator conducted a search for the submarine HMAS AE1 lost in 1914, possibly due to a diving accident, off the Duke of York Islands. This expedition was funded by the Commonwealth Government and the Silentworld Foundation with additional assistance from the Submarine Institute of Australia and the Australian National Maritime Museum. As a result of this effort, the submarine was found at a depth of 300 metres (980 ft) and was seen to be well preserved and in one piece. The exact location of the wreck was not announced by the Australian government at the time of discovery, in order to protect it from "unauthorised salvage attempts". The government's stated position is that the wreck will be treated as a war grave.

== Equipment ==
The ship has digital seismic, acoustic, seabed, and sub-seabed mapping equipment as well as a dedicated Hugin 1000 autonomous underwater vehicle (capable of reaching 3,000 m depths).
