= West Ridge (ship) =

Merchant ship lost in 1883

Coordinates: 37°53′28″S 88°59′14″E

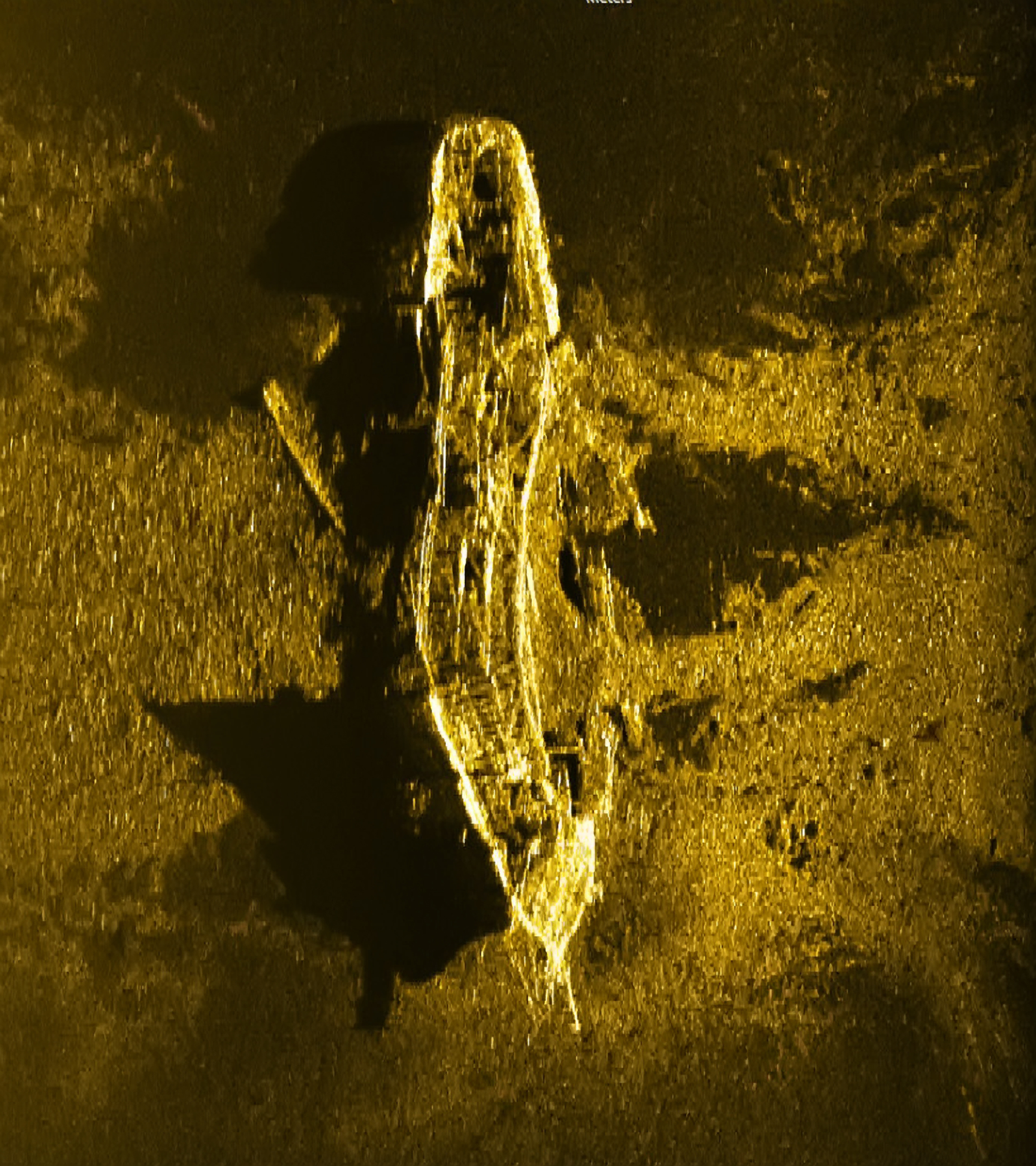
- A synthetic aperture sonar image of the wreck of West Ridge

History
- Name: West Ridge
- Completed: 1869
- Fate: Sank July 1883

General characteristics
- Type: Barque
- Length: 220 feet (70 m)

West Ridge is a merchant ship that was lost in July 1883 carrying coal between Liverpool and Bombay. In May 2018, it was reported that the wreck of the ship had been found in 2015 during the search for Malaysia Airlines Flight 370. A maritime archaeologist at the Western Australia Museum said that the evidence indicated that the likely cause of the loss of the ship was an explosion.

== History ==
West Ridge was built in Glasgow in 1869. She was an iron barque of 220 feet (70 m). The ship was lost in July 1883 when en route from Liverpool to Bombay carrying a cargo of steam coal. Her captain at the time was John Arthurson from Shetland and her crew included sailors from Britain, Scandinavia, Ireland, and Canada. All 28 crew were lost. A subsequent enquiry ruled out a common hazard among coal carriers, an explosion of gas from coal fumes, as the cause of the loss as the ship, finding that West Ridge was "particularly well-ventilated". Between August 1878 and June 1886, 302 British-registered vessels carrying coal were lost at sea.

== Discovery ==
On 19 December 2015, searchers for the lost Malaysia Airlines Flight 370 using sonar discovered wreckage at a depth of 12,000 feet (4,000 m) on the seabed of the southern Indian Ocean, 1,500 miles (2,400 km) to the west of Australia. After marine archaeologists consulted shipping records and newspaper reports they determined that the ship was probably the West Ridge. Coal recovered from the site was found to be of British origin, and the dimensions of the wreck matched those of the West Ridge. The ship would have weighed between 1,000 and 1,500 tons.

Ross Anderson, curator of maritime archaeology at the Western Australian Museum, said that the possibility that the wreck was Kooringa (1894) or Lake Ontario (1897), also lost in the area, was less likely. Although an explosion was discounted by the loss enquiry, Anderson said that "The evidence points to the ship sinking as a result of a catastrophic event such as an explosion, which was common in the transport of coal cargos."

== See also ==
- Seabed Constructor
