= Fugro =

Dutch multinational public company headquartered in Leidschendam, Netherlands,

Fugro N.V.
- Native name: Ingenieursbureau voor Funderingstechniek en Grondmechanica
- Type: Naamloze vennootschap
- Traded as: Euronext Amsterdam: FUR
- ISIN: NL0006177065; NL00150003E1; NL00150004A7
- Industry: Oil and gas, Renewables, Infrastructure, Nautical
- Founded: 1962
- Founder: Kornelis Joustra
- Headquarters: Nootdorp, Netherlands
- Number of locations: 200 (2003); ▲250 (2007); ▲275 (2009); ▲282 (2012)
- Area served: Worldwide
- Key people: Mark Heine (chairman of the board of management/CEO); Harrie L.J. Noy (chairman of the supervisory board) Peter McKenzie ( ROV Superintendent)
- Products: Van-based street pavement survey systems
- Services: Marine site characterisation, Marine asset integrity, Land site characterisation and Land asset integrity services
- Revenue: ▲€1.77 billion (2022); ▲€1.46 billion (2021)
- Number of employees: 9,000 (2006); ▲ >13,000 (2009); ▲14,000 (2012)
- Subsidiaries: Fugro Aerial & Mobile Mapping; Fugro Chance; Fugro Geoservices; Fugro Subsea; Fugro Survey Pty. Ltd.; John Chance Land Surveys
- Website: www.fugro.com

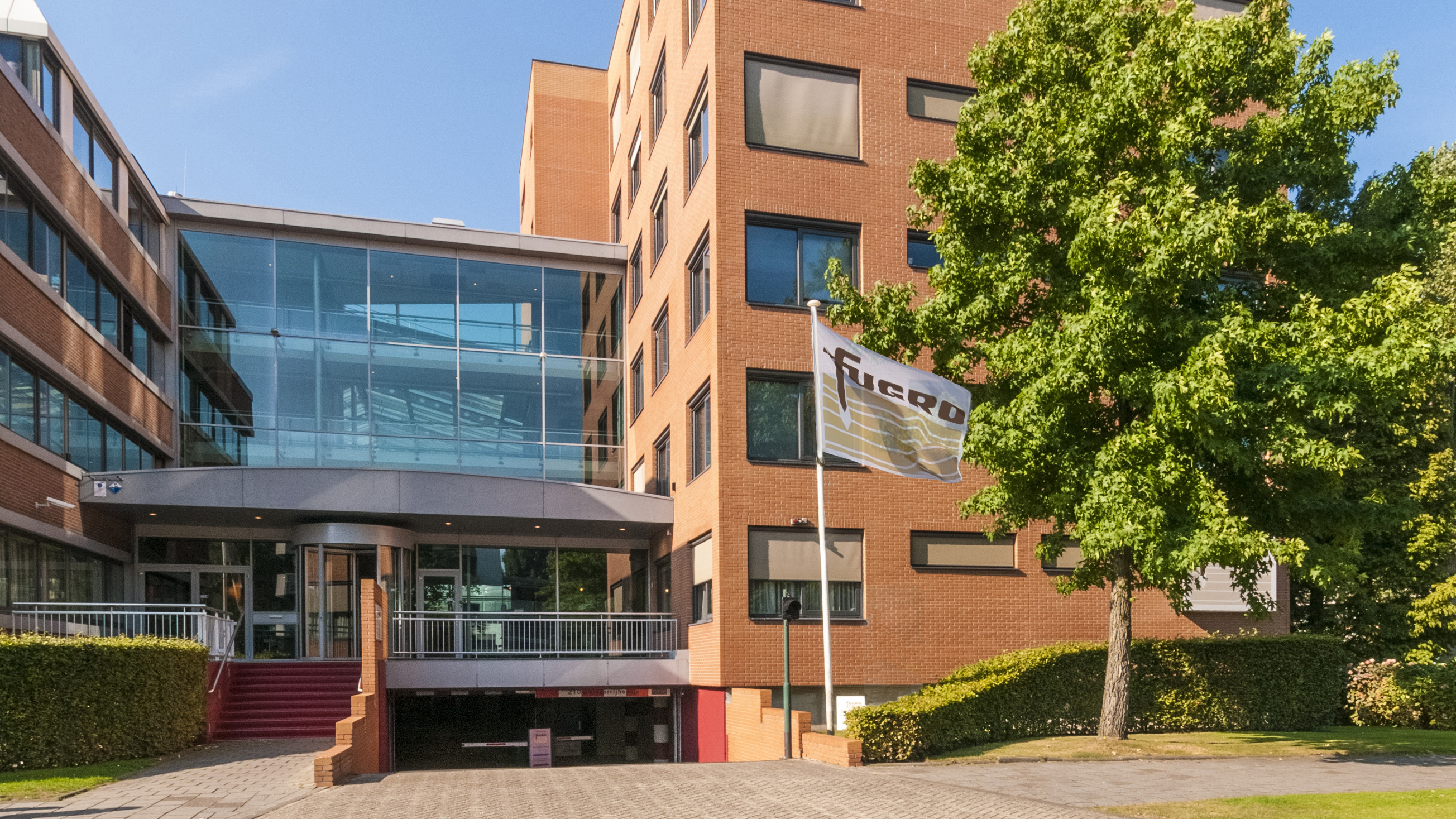
Former head office, Leidschendam, Netherlands.

Fugro NV is a Dutch multinational public company headquartered in Nootdorp, Netherlands. The company is primarily a service company focused on geotechnical, survey and geoscience services, and is listed on Euronext Amsterdam. Mark Heine is Fugro's CEO and Chairman of the Board of Management, while Harrie L.J. Noy is Chairman of the Supervisory Board.

Fugro started as a land-based business, surveying and conducting soil analyses. The firm subsequently expanded into marine operations to service clients involved in offshore oil and gas production, and developed advanced undersea sonar and robotics.

== History ==
Kornelis "Kees" (Note: Kees is a Dutch abbreviation of Kornelis) Joustra founded Fugro on 2 May 1962 as Ingenieursbureau voor Funderingstechniek en Grondmechanica, Dutch for "Engineering Company for Foundation Technology and Soil Mechanics". In the wake of the 1970s energy crisis the offshore business came to a standstill. This resulted in the acquisition of its main competitor, McClelland, into Fugro-McClelland in October 1987.

In 1991, Fugro Chance formed in Lafayette, Louisiana as a subsidiary through the acquisition of a small surveying company led by John Chance. By 2007, this subsidiary and two others—John Chance Land Surveys and Fugro GeoServices (formerly John Chance Marine Surveying)—employed 455 in the Lafayette area.

In April 1992, Fugro went public on the Amsterdam Stock Exchange. In 2003, Fugro bought Thales Geosolutions for €147.5 million, its largest acquisition to date. In September 2012, CGGVeritas acquired Fugro's Geoscience Division for €1.2 billion.

The first recipient of Fugro's Herman Zuidberg Award for Innovation was named in 2006, Dariusz Lapucha of Poland who moved to the United States and was working for the Fugro Chance subsidiary at the time of the award. Lapucha garnered the award for his work on an enhanced GPS receiver with a practical resolution of a few inches, which improved "the technical ability and profitability of the Fugro organization". This same year, Fugro Chance was the first recipient of the Fugro Award of Excellence, bestowed by "the chief executive officer of Fugro to the member of the Fugro group of companies that makes the most outstanding contribution during the year"; specifically, Fugro Chance was recognized for their response to hurricanes Ivan, Katrina and Rita.

Fugro purchased the Remote Observation Automated Modeling Economic Simulation (ROAMES) technology from Ergon Energy in 2014.

In January 2015, Royal Boskalis increased its shareholding in Fugro to 20.1%.

In February 2023, Fugro purchased two platform supply vessels (PSVs) Topaz Endurance and Topaz Energy with the aim to re-purpose the vessels to support subsea surveys in the offshore gas, oil, and renewable industries.

In February 2023, Fugro opened a new operations center in St. John's, Canada for controlling offshore survey operations.

In November 2023, Furgo acquired SEA-KIT International to push the boundaries of USV technology.

In November 2025, the head office moved from Leidschendam to Nootdorp, where a new head office has been built.

== Activities ==
In June 2014, the Australian Transport Safety Bureau (ATSB) awarded Fugro, through its subsidiary Fugro Survey Pty. Ltd., the contract to conduct the search for Malaysia Airlines Flight 370, despite the firm's "limited experience searching for wrecks on the ocean floor". The initial contract was worth AUD$52 million, which Fugro won in a bid against several firms including Oceaneering International, Odyssey Marine Explorations and Blue Water Recoveries. In August 2014 it was awarded an additional contract for the deployment of two specialist vessels. Fugro had around 200 employees and 3 search vessels dedicated to the search for MH370. In 2015, in the midst of the search, the company received many criticisms related to their methods and equipment.

The Fugro Chance subsidiary, based in Louisiana, provides services to the oil industry in the Gulf of Mexico including making available without cost underwater maps, current and historical, of pipeline courses, useful in the context of post-hurricane damage assessment and property assessment prior to leasing of underwater property from the Bureau of Ocean Energy Management (BOEM). Fugro Chance has also contracted with the United States Army Corps of Engineers to conduct airborne laser mapping toward the creation and updating of nautical charts and maps. Fugro Geoservices, another firm which arose from a 1991 merger in Louisiana which is now based in Houston, Texas, provides boat-based underwater video, sonar, seismic, and magnetic sensing to firms engaged in oil and gas exploration and the aforementioned BOEM US government agency. Fugro provides similar services in Canada, with the inclusion of remotely operated uncrewed devices which have advantages of minimizing risks to crewed vessels, reducing data latency and increasing analysis speed.

Rutherford County, Tennessee, contracted with Fugro Earthdata in 2004 to conduct the county's first digital mapping project. The county has retained this Fugro subsidiary's services for orthoimagery, topographic mapping, and geographic information systems (GIS) through at least 2014.

By 2015, "about 20" state departments of transportation in the United States had purchased and deployed "video-and-laser-equipped vans" used to survey street pavement conditions, so-called "spider vans", from Fugro; the firm is one of several that manufacture such systems.

In 2022 Fugro opened the Fugro SpAARC spacecraft mission control center in Perth, Australia.

In 2023, Fugro, along with Australia's Defense Department, was involved in the search for the wreck of the SS Montevideo Maru which had sunk during WW2. The shipwreck was discovered off the northwest coast of Luzon Island, on 22 April 2023. For the search, which started on 6 April, an autonomous underwater vehicle was used.

== Controversy ==
According to an 18 December 2022 broadcast by Dutch KRO-NCRV television programme Pointer, Brazilian police stated Fugro had been involved in the Brumadinho dam disaster in Brazil in 2019 in which 270 people were killed. As a result, many investors lost their confidence, and a day after the broadcast, Fugro lost almost a third of its stock value at the Amsterdam stock exchange.

On November 1, 2024, Fugro announced that the Brazilian authorities had closed the investigation into the disaster, and that no further legal action against Fugro would be taken. This decision followed a March 2024 suspension of several lawsuits regarding the dam collapse.

== See also ==
- List of oilfield service companies
