= Malaysia Airlines Flight 370 disappearance theories =

Theories of plane's disappearance in 2014

Malaysia Airlines Flight 370 disappeared on 8 March 2014, after departing from Kuala Lumpur for Beijing, with 227 passengers and 12 crew members on board. Najib Razak, Malaysia's prime minister at the time, stated that the aircraft's flight ended somewhere in the Indian Ocean, but no further explanation was given. Despite searches finding debris which almost certainly originated from the crash, official announcements were questioned by many critics. As such, several theories about the disappearance were proposed. Some of these were described as conspiracy theories.

== Background ==
According to Rob Brotherton, a psychology lecturer at Goldsmiths, University of London, whenever there is a lack of conclusive information following headline-grabbing events, conspiracy theorists rush to fill the factual vacuum that is created.

Victims' relatives questioned the veracity of the Malaysian government's statements about the fate of the aircraft. They organized a protest at the Malaysian embassy in Beijing, aiming to force the Malaysian government to reveal any withheld information about Flight 370's whereabouts.

According to Barbara Demick of the Los Angeles Times, critics of the Malaysian government's statements also found support in the Joint Agency Coordination Centre's announcement on 29 May 2014 that the plane was not in the search area authorities had been combing since April 2014. Other factors involve the lack of a distress signal from the plane. Searches discovered debris and fragments in 2015, which likely originated from the crash.

=== Criticism and response ===
Conspiracy-focused internet sites claim that the official statement that the plane crashed into the Indian Ocean is "a blatant cover-up." They note that a Boeing 777 does not have the structural integrity to survive crashing into the ocean, and that it would be comparable to hitting a concrete wall at terminal velocity. If Flight 370 hit the ocean, they say, it would have been broken into tens of thousands of pieces, many of which float on water (such as the seat cushions) and would be seen washing up on regional shores or easily spotted by search teams. Those criticisms diminished after several pieces of the aircraft were positively identified in the years after its disappearance.

Harvard professor Cass Sunstein noted that the conflicting information initially released by the Malaysian government explains the interest in alternative theories. Sunstein argued in an interview with The Wall Street Journal on 20 March 2014 that conspiracy theories in general often are born out of horrific and disastrous situations because such events make people angry, fearful and looking for a "target".

David Soucie, a former FAA inspector, has said that the theories that have been put forth in this matter are important when there is a lack of knowledge, as the theories and notions help us to consider various possibilities. On 26 March 2014, he stated on CNN:

In an accident investigation, it's a critical part to come up with theories. Especially right now when we don't have anything. We don't have anything tangible. We don't have something to say, hey, yes—because we don't know where that airplane is and we need to find out why. If you take one theory, the airplane would be where we're looking at right now. If you take another theory, where there was nefarious intent, they're trying to avoid radars, the airplane could be somewhere else. If you say it was—whatever it is, you've got to use these theories, weigh them against the facts so you know which one to go to.

Tim Black, deputy editor of Spiked, wrote: "...it's in this darkness, this near absence of knowledge [about MH370], that speculation has flourished," and an editorial in the Chicago Sun-Times not only stated that "conspiracy theories fill a vacuum when facts are scarce," but also urged governments to search for the plane to debunk these theories and give victims' family members peace of mind.

The common hypothesis, cited also here, that MH370 avoided Indonesian radar is based only on a statement that the plane was not observed by Indonesia.

== Pilot suicide/mass murder ==
MH370’s presumed flight path is in yellow. Captain Shah's simulated flight is in red.

Shortly after Flight 370's disappearance, media reports revealed that Captain Zaharie Ahmad Shah's wife and three children moved out of his house the day before the disappearance; and a friend claimed that Captain Shah was seeing another woman and Shah's relationship with her was also in trouble. Claims of domestic problems have been denied by Shah's family. A fellow pilot and long-time associate of Shah stated the captain was "terribly upset" that his marriage was falling apart. Police were also investigating reports that Shah received a two-minute phone call prior to the flight's departure from an unidentified woman using a mobile phone number obtained with a false identity. Furthermore, Captain Shah was also a supporter of Malaysian opposition politician Anwar Ibrahim, who was sentenced to jail on March 7 after an earlier acquittal on sodomy charges was overturned in a move viewed as politically motivated. Shah was in the courtroom the day before the flight.

Investigators noted strange behaviour by Shah from conducting 170 interviews—namely, that the Captain had made no social or professional plans for after March 8, when Flight 370 disappeared. However, according to the French journalist Florence de Changy who wrote a book about the flight, dismissing "100 per cent of the official narrative", Shah made an appointment with his dentist to get back his tooth crown when the dentist phoned him a few days before March 8. News reports about the Captain's lack of social plans and flight simulator exercises cite results of the police enquiry into the pilots, which have been shared with some of the investigation team but have not been released publicly. However, news reports on July 23, 2014 stated that the police considered the possible culpability of all those onboard the plane, and identified the captain as the prime suspect—if it is proven human intervention was involved.

The United States' Federal Bureau of Investigation reconstructed the deleted data from Captain Shah's home flight simulator; a Malaysian government spokesman indicated that "nothing sinister" had been found on it. However, The Sunday Times later reported that among deleted flight paths performed on the flight simulator, investigators found a flight path into the Southern Ocean where a simulated landing was made on an island with a small runway. In 2016, a leaked American document stated that a route on the pilot's home flight simulator closely matching the projected flight over the Indian Ocean was found during the FBI analysis of the hard drive of the computer used for the flight simulator. This was later confirmed by the Australian Transport Safety Bureau (ATSB) and by the Malaysian government. In the ATSB's 2017 report "The Operational Search for MH370," new details were provided regarding the flight simulator path. It had been flown five weeks prior to the disappearance on February 2 and was reconstructed from data deleted on February 3. The simulated aircraft was a Boeing 777-200LR. The first data point showed the flight beginning in Kuala Lumpur. Subsequent data points indicated the aircraft flying northwest along the Strait of Malacca before tracking southeast to the fifth data point, located deep in the southern Indian Ocean, where fuel exhaustion occurred. In the sixth and final data point, the altitude was manually set to 4000ft, with the aircraft observed in a nose-down pitch of 5°. The report states:

There were enough similarities to the flight path of MH370 for the ATSB to carefully consider the possible implications for the underwater search area. These considerations included the impact on the search area if the aircraft had been either glided after fuel exhaustion or ditched under power prior to fuel exhaustion with active control of the aircraft from the cockpit.

Tony Abbott was Prime Minister of Australia when MH370 disappeared. In February 2020, six years after the plane disappeared, Abbott disclosed in a Sky News documentary: "My very clear understanding, from the very top levels of the Malaysian government, is that from very, very early on, they thought it was murder-suicide by the pilot." Shah's family vehemently denied the possibility of pilot suicide.

Many aviation experts believe, and some analyses of the flap and flaperon debris suggest, that the shearing damage evident on the trailing edges of the flap and flaperon, coupled with the minimal damage observed on the leading edges, strongly suggests a controlled ditching as the likely end-of-flight scenario. This perspective contrasts sharply with the ATSB's hypothesis of a high-speed, uncontrolled plummet following fuel exhaustion. The distinct lack of substantial leading edge damage and clean shearing of the trailing edges contradicts what would be expected from a high-velocity impact.

A book, Goodnight Malaysian 370, was published in August 2014 by New Zealanders Geoff Taylor and Ewan Wilson; the authors blamed a deliberate act of the pilot for the aircraft's disappearance, but admitted they were not able to "provide any conclusive evidence to support his theory" nor any motive.

In 2015, a former British Airways senior Boeing 777 pilot, Simon Hardy, told BBC News that the plane's route was "probably very accurate flying rather than just a coincidence", and noted that the aircraft's turn toward the north-west over the Malacca Strait allowed a clear view of the captain's home island of Penang:

Someone was taking a long, emotional look at Penang ... there were actually three turns, not one. Someone was looking at Penang.

In May 2018, Hardy repeated his claim on 60 Minutes Australia that the captain used the flight as a murder–suicide and had deliberately flown the plane over his hometown of Penang before turning right and ditching the plane over the Indian Ocean. He said they found these results by reconstructing the captain's flight plan from the military radar and that the captain had avoided detection of the plane by military radar by flying along the border of Malaysia and Thailand, crossing in and out of each country's airspaces.

The cockpit had the mandated anti-hijacker fortified doors that could prevent locked-out crew or passengers from interfering with a suicide or hijacking into the Southern Ocean. A British television documentary, broadcast in March 2024, suggested that Captain Zaharie Ahmad could have selected manual control of the cabin conditioning system to deprive all occupants of air.

In 2022, retired French captain Patrick Blelly and senior telecom engineer Jean-Luc Marchand released a long report about scientific-based figures arguing for a pilot suicide, and used flight simulators to support their findings. In 2023 and 2024, they gave several conferences in which they discussed their scenario.

== Hijacking ==
The possibility of a simple hijacking has been brought up by various news outlets, including ABC News and the Los Angeles Times. Speculation has mounted about the possibility that hijackers took the plane to a remote island, although no group has claimed responsibility; unofficial researchers have identified more than 600 possible runways at which the plane was capable of landing. No confirmation has been received from Malaysian officials. The credibility of several hijacking theories have become further marginalized following the discovery of the first definitive fragments of MH370 wreckage in July 2015.

=== Terrorist attack ===
Shortly after the aircraft disappeared, it was claimed that it may have been an act of terrorism, possibly a conspiracy attack. Between 9 and 14 March 2014, media mogul Rupert Murdoch tweeted that Flight 370's disappearance "confirms conspiracy turning to make trouble for China [sic]." He later suggested the flight might have been hidden in northern Pakistan, "like Bin Laden". These remarks have not been confirmed, and were characterized as conspiracy theories by Shiv Malik in The Guardian. The following month, the Russian newspaper Moskovskij Komsomolets endorsed a similar theory, claiming that "unknown terrorists" had hijacked the plane, flown it to Afghanistan, and then held the crew and passengers hostage.

=== North Korea ===
A story circulated on Reddit that MH370 had sufficient fuel to be hijacked to North Korea as was done in 1969 with a Korean Air Lines YS-11.

=== Acquisition of Freescale staff ===
A variety of social media posts and email chain letters claim that a patent (#8671381) was approved days after the disappearance of the MH370, and the right to the patent was split five ways—20% to Freescale Semiconductor and 20% each to four employees, all of whom were passengers on the plane. The patent deals with fabrication of integrated circuits on a semiconductor wafer. The fact-checking website snopes.com suggests that there is no evidence that the four inventors listed on the patent application were on the aircraft passenger list, nor that they were entitled to a 20% share of the patent, and it says it is unlikely that their share would revert to Freescale on their death as presented in the email.

=== Diego Garcia ===
Conspiracy theorists have suggested that MH370 was either captured by U.S. Navy SEALs and then flown to the U.S. Naval base on the atoll of Diego Garcia in the British Indian Ocean Territory to bring to justice Chinese computer scientists believed to be responsible for hacking attacks on U.S. Department of Defense computer servers or that the plane landed at the base directly after being instructed to travel there. The latter theory was raised at a White House daily briefing on 18 March, whereupon press secretary Jay Carney responded, "I'll rule that one out." Underpinning the Diego Garcia theory were several elements, one of which was the co-pilot's mobile phone contact and the plane's westward turn, both of which were consistent with a flight path toward the island.

In that vein, it was reported by the Daily Mirror, without giving a concrete source, that the captain had trained in landing on an Indian Ocean island with a short runway, using a flight simulator in his home computer. Several mass media sources reported that the captain had trained using his flight simulator to land on five runways—each at least 1,000 metres (0.62 mi) long—in the Indian Ocean region, namely Diego Garcia and Male International Airport (MLE) and other airstrips in India and Sri Lanka.

These allegations were disputed by the FBI, which reported that after analyzing the impounded flight simulator, it had found "nothing suspicious whatsoever" and said that the Mirror's reports about the simulator's contents were "unsubstantiated and unsourced". Giving a new twist to the MH370 missing story, a former French airline boss has claimed that the Malaysia Airlines flight was shot down by the U.S. military near their base on Diego Garcia.

In an article published on 18 March 2014, journalists Farah Ahmed and Ahmed Naif of the Maldivian newspaper Haveeru wrote: "...several residents of Kuda Huvadhoo told Haveeru on Tuesday that they saw a 'low flying jumbo jet' at around 06:15 on March 8. They said that it was a white aircraft, with red stripes across it—which is what the Malaysia Airlines flights typically look like. Eyewitnesses from the Kuda Huvadhoo concurred that the jet was traveling North to South-East, towards the Southern tip of the Maldives—Addu. They also noted the incredibly loud noise that the flight made when it flew over the island. 'I've never seen a jet flying so low over our island before. We've seen seaplanes, but I'm sure that this was not one of those. I could even make out the doors on the plane clearly.' said an eyewitness. 'It's not just me either, several other residents have reported seeing the exact same thing. Some people got out of their houses to see what was causing the tremendous noise too.' Mohamed Zaheem, the Island Councilor of Kuda Huvadhoo, said that the residents of the island had spoken about the incident."

The discovery in late July 2015 of debris from a Boeing 777, on a beach on Réunion island, east of Madagascar, suspected (and later deemed "highly likely") to be from MH370, quickly led to renewed Internet speculation that the plane had been shot down near Diego Garcia, which is 1,475 miles (2,374 km) away from Réunion, out of fears of a terrorist attack. However, oceanographers such as Professor Charitha Pattiaratchi from the University of Western Australia said that "the arrival of MH370 debris in Réunion would conform to the expected path of ocean currents from the point in its flight path where it was believed to have crashed". Many people, including some of those who believed the plane had landed safely on Diego Garcia (or elsewhere), quickly dismissed the debris as fake.

=== Phantom cellphone theory ===
Some had speculated that the passengers were still alive but could not answer their cellphones—sometimes known as the "phantom cellphone theory". This was based on early reports that family members of Flight 370 passengers heard ringing (as opposed to a busy/off signal) while calling the passengers' phones, though this was after the disappearance. However, this was later challenged by Jeff Kagan, a wireless analyst, who in an email to NBC News explained that the network may still produce "ringbacks" as it searches for a connection, even if the cellphone has been destroyed.

== Fire ==
A number of theories suggest that the disappearance may have been the result of a fire in the cockpit, cargo compartment, landing gear, or another part of the plane.

In an earlier incident involving a Boeing 777, on 29 July 2011, EgyptAir Flight 667 suffered an intense oxygen-fed cockpit fire while still on the ground which destroyed the flight controls, the instruments and burnt a hole through the hull of the aircraft. Despite the arrival of firefighters within three minutes, the fire took 90 minutes to extinguish. Malaysia Air's maintenance records for the 777 aircraft are required to include information on whether the FAA-mandated fix to the wiring near the co-pilot's oxygen hose and replacement of the oxygen hose with one without metallic components was performed. While not conclusive proof, none of the washed-up wreckage exhibited any signs of fire damage. Debris from MH370 was discovered in February 2016 that seemed to indicate burn marks, but expert analysis by the NTSB showed it was just resin discoloring the wreckage.

Another suggestion is that the pilots had turned back and were attempting an emergency landing at the nearest suitable airport in Northern Malaysia, perhaps Penang International Airport or Langkawi International Airport (Langkawi Island), a 13,000-foot-long (4.0 km) airstrip with an approach over water with no obstacles. The emergency may have been due to an incident similar to the 11 July 1991 accident involving a Douglas DC-8, Nigeria Airways Flight 2120, where a tire caught fire on takeoff, and the ensuing conflagration led to the destruction of the aircraft with the loss of 261 lives. In another accident, involving a fire on a McDonnell Douglas MD-11 on 2 September 1998, Swissair Flight 111 from New York to Geneva developed a cockpit fire in the electrical wiring that spread rapidly, leading to a loss of flight instruments and control. The aircraft crashed into the Atlantic Ocean with the loss of 229 lives, 8 kilometres (5.0 mi) from shore, southwest of Halifax International Airport, Nova Scotia, where the plane was attempting an emergency landing. In the Swissair case, the transponders and communications systems failed due to fire and heat damage in the avionics circuit breaker panel.

== Shoot-down hypothesis ==
American political commentator Rush Limbaugh, according to CNN, speculated that the aircraft may have been shot down. Supporters of this theory have noted that civilian aircraft have been shot down by military forces in the past, with Iran Air Flight 655 by the United States in 1988 and KAL 007 by the Soviet Union in 1983 being two frequently cited examples. On 19 March 2014, news agency reporter Scott Mayerowitz of Associated Press described "Accidental Shootdown" as one of seven "leading, plausible theories", but added that there was "no evidence that Flight 370 was brought down by a government entity". A Malaysian defense official, Ackbal bin Haji Abdul Samad, said it was "highly not possible" that his country's air force had shot down the plane. According to The Financial Express, the Malaysian Air Force detected the plane on radar while it was in flight, but it took no action because it was believed to be a "friendly" aircraft.

In May 2014, author Nigel Cawthorne's book Flight MH370: The Mystery was published. Cawthorne alleged that after the jet was shot down during a U.S.–Thai Joint Strike Fighter jet training exercise, searchers intentionally were sent astray as part of a sophisticated cover-up. The book received considerable criticism, especially from The Australian, where it was characterised thus: "Cawthorne undoes everybody's good work by retrieving every obsolete and discredited non-fact from the trash, slapping the whole lot between covers." Relatives of those aboard Flight 370 criticised the book as "premature and insensitive".

In a CNN interview on 24 April 2014, the Malaysian Prime Minister, Najib Razak, stated only that the radar "tracked an aircraft which did a turn back, but they were not exactly sure whether it was MH370. What they were sure of was that the aircraft was not deemed to be hostile."

On 22 December 2014, the former head of Proteus Airlines, Marc Dugain, claimed that the plane may have been shot down by U.S. military personnel out of fear of an attack on Naval Support Facility Diego Garcia similar to the September 11 attacks. The claims were described by the source article as "wild".

== Cyberattack ==
The hypothesis that a cyberattack may have been carried out on Flight 370 has been raised, primarily based on statements made by Sally Leivesley, a former scientific advisor to the UK government. Leivesley proposed that hackers may have changed the plane's speed, direction, and altitude using radio signals to the plane's flight management system. Whether existing security on commercial flights is sufficient to prevent such an attack is also a matter of debate, although Boeing has dismissed the possibility. A spokeswoman for the company, Gayla Keller, said that they were "confident in the robust protection of all flight[-]critical systems and inability for a hacker to gain access by either external or internal means on the 777 and all Boeing airplanes."

Supporters of this theory have cited an app created by Hugo Teso with which Teso was able to hack into pilot-training software. Teso presented his findings at a conference in April 2013. The Federal Aviation Administration and other major governmental bodies dismissed the significance of the app. They stated that the software on an actual plane would be different from the software on which Teso had tested his app.

== Vertical entry into the sea ==
Texas A&M University mathematics professor Goong Chen has argued that the plane may have entered the sea vertically; any other angle of entry would have splintered the airplane into many pieces, which would have necessarily been found already.

== MH17 and QZ8501 connections ==
On 17 July 2014, Malaysia Airlines Flight 17 was shot down over Ukraine. Because it, like Flight 370, was also a Boeing 777, some conspiracy theorists have suggested that the plane that crashed in Ukraine was actually Flight 370. This is based in part on photographs of the crash scene, which conspiracy theorists claim show that the plane that crashed in Ukraine had structural similarities to MH370. Experts have dismissed this theory and argued that it is merely coincidental that both planes involved belonged to the same airline.

When Indonesia AirAsia Flight 8501 crashed on 28 December 2014, various similarities with MH370 were noted, including that both airlines were Malaysian-owned, and that both planes lost contact with air traffic control. There was also a reported conspiracy theory involving an alleged prediction on 15 December 2014 on Chinese news sites. A post warned Chinese people to stay away from AirAsia as it would be attacked, as MH370 and MH17 allegedly had been (according to the user), as part of a conspiracy by a "black hand" or "despicable international bully" to harm Malaysian-owned airlines. Other online posters suggested that the user was either a Chinese intelligence official or a hacker who had come across secret information.

== Other theories ==
The theory that MH370 may have been consumed by a black hole received considerable attention when Don Lemon asked, on CNN, whether it was "preposterous" that it could have happened. Lemon was criticised for this by former U.S. Department of Transportation Inspector General Mary Schiavo, who, while appearing on CNN, said that "...a small black hole would suck in our entire universe so we know it's not that." TheWire.com (which "wasn't satisfied" with Schiavo's answer) obtained detailed reasons why a black hole could not swallow a plane from Columbia University astronomy professor David J. Helfand and Peter Michelson, a professor of physics at Stanford University. Digitally altered videos allegedly showing the plane being surrounded by three moving orbs and suddenly vanishing into thin air were shared online in 2014.

Another hypothesis is that a meteor might have struck the plane; however, the statistical probability for this is extremely low.

In March 2018, around the fourth anniversary of Flight 370's disappearance, an individual received strange voicemails and texts with coordinates of a location in Indonesia somewhat close to where Flight 370 vanished. The voicemails, coded in the NATO Phonetic Alphabet, alluded to an alien abduction. This generated significant media attention, as the man who received the texts and voicemails also claimed that someone had shown up and taken pictures of his house, although this was never conclusively verified. The calls were placed using a VoIP service and were traced to two hotels in Port Blair, though the identity of the caller remains uncertain. Investigators dismissed the phone calls as most likely being a prank or hoax.

== Claims of responsibility ==
On 9 March 2014, members of the Chinese news media received an open letter that claimed to be from the leader of the Chinese Martyrs Brigade, a previously unknown group. The letter claimed that the loss of Flight 370 was in retaliation for the Chinese government's response to the knife attacks at Kunming railway station on 1 March 2014 and part of the wider separatist campaign against Chinese control over Xinjiang province. The letter also listed unspecified grievances against the Malaysian government. The letter's claim was dismissed as fraudulent based on its lack of detail regarding the fate of Flight 370 and the fact that the name "Chinese Martyrs Brigade" appeared inconsistent with Uyghur separatist groups which describe themselves as "East Turkestan" and "Islamic" rather than "Chinese".

== See also ==
- 9/11 conspiracy theories
- MH370: The Plane That Disappeared: Netflix 2023 docuseries released on ninth anniversary of the disappearance
- List of accidents and incidents involving commercial aircraft
- List of aircraft accidents and incidents resulting in at least 50 fatalities

Specific incidents

- SilkAir Flight 185, another disputed crash involving pilot suicide
- Germanwings Flight 9525
- Japan Airlines Flight 350
- LAM Mozambique Airlines Flight 470
- Royal Air Maroc Flight 630
- 2018 Horizon Air Q400 incident
