= Marine debris of Malaysia Airlines Flight 370 =

2014 aircraft disappearance

Malaysia Airlines Flight 370 (MH370/MAS370) disappeared on 8 March 2014, after departing from Kuala Lumpur for Beijing, with 227 passengers and 12 crew members on board. Marine Debris from Flight 370 has been recovered from shores across the western Indian Ocean since July 2015. The first confirmed piece of debris, a right flaperon, was found on Réunion on 29 July 2015, more than a year after the aircraft disappeared on 8 March 2014. Other recovered pieces have been confirmed to be parts of Flight 370, or have been identified as possibly belonging to it. Investigators have examined the damage on the confirmed wreckage and have used drift models to project Flight 370's impact area, and to identify areas to search.

== Debris ==
By October 2017, twenty pieces of debris believed to be from 9M-MRO had been recovered from beaches in the western Indian Ocean; 18 of the items were "identified as being very likely or almost certain to originate from MH370", while the other two were "assessed as probably from the accident aircraft." On 16 August 2017, the ATSB released two reports: the analysis of satellite imagery collected on 23 March 2014, two weeks after MH370 disappeared, classifying 12 objects in the ocean as "probably man-made"; and a drift study of the recovered objects by the CSIRO, identifying the crash area "with unprecedented precision and certainty" at 35.6°S 92.8°E, northeast of the main 120,000 km^{2} (46,000 mi^{2}) underwater search zone.

=== Flaperon ===
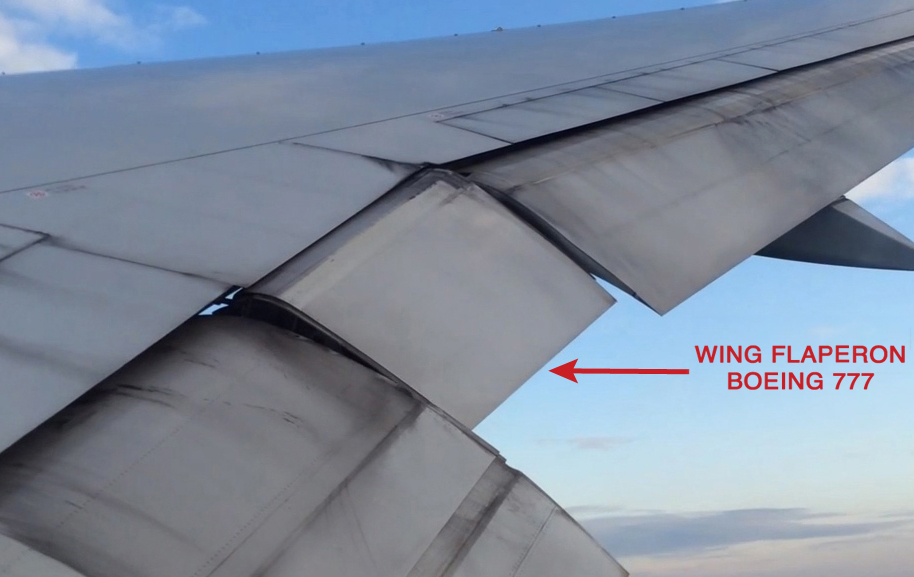
Boeing 777 flaperon

Location of flaperon discovery relative to Flight 370's flight path and the main search area

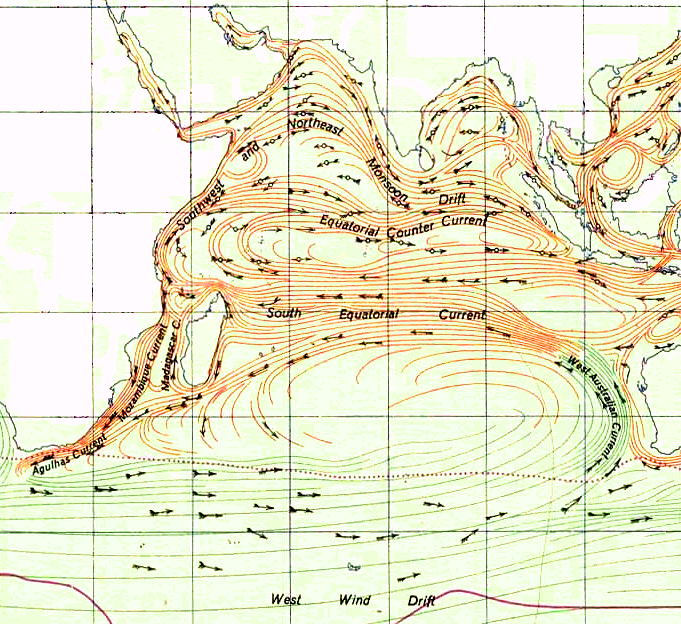
Currents within the Indian Ocean

The first item of debris to be positively identified as originating from Flight 370 was the right flaperon (a trailing edge control surface). It was discovered in late July 2015 on a beach in Saint-André on Réunion, an island in the western Indian Ocean, about 4,000 km (2,200 nmi; 2,500 mi) west of the underwater search area. The item was transported from Réunion (an overseas department of France) to Toulouse, where it was examined by France's civil aviation accident investigation agency, the Bureau of Enquiry and Analysis for Civil Aviation Safety (BEA), and a French defence ministry laboratory. Malaysia sent its own investigators to both Réunion and Toulouse. On 3 September 2015, French officials announced that serial numbers found on internal components of the flaperon linked it "with certainty" to Flight 370. These serial numbers were retrieved using a borescope. An analysis of the flaperon indicated it had been in a stowed position. “It was established from the debris that the aircraft was not configured for a ditching at the end-of-flight, ” the ATSB concluded. The finding is significant because several television pundits have suggested the pilots had extended the flaperons in an attempt to make a controlled ditching of the aircraft when it ran out of fuel. The ATSB's conclusion eliminates that possible scenario.

After the discovery, French police conducted a search of the waters around Réunion for additional debris. This found a damaged suitcase that was initially linked to Flight 370, but officials have since doubted this connection. The location of the discovery was consistent with models of debris dispersal 16 months after an origin in the search area then in progress off the west coast of Australia. A Chinese water bottle and an Indonesian cleaning product were also found in the same area.

In August 2015, France carried out an aerial search for possible marine debris around the island, covering an area of 120 by 40 km (75 by 25 mi) along the east coast of Réunion. Foot patrols were also planned to search for debris along the beaches. Malaysia asked authorities in neighbouring states to be on the alert for marine debris that might have come from an aircraft. On 14 August, it was announced that no debris that could be traced to Flight 370 had been found at sea off Réunion, but that some items had been found on land. Air and sea searches for debris ended on 17 August.

The flaperon was covered in Lepas anatifera barnacles, which grow in certain patterns and only while underwater. Researchers have analysed the barnacles on the flaperon in an attempt to deduce its path to Réunion.

=== Parts from the right stabiliser and right wing ===
In late February 2016, an object bearing a stencilled label of "NO STEP" was found off the coast of Mozambique; early photographic analysis suggested that it could have come from the aircraft's horizontal stabiliser or from the leading edges of the wings. The part was found by Blaine Gibson on a sandbank in the Bazaruto Archipelago off the coast of Vilanculos in southern Mozambique, around 2,000 km (1,200 mi) southwest of where the flaperon had been found the previous July. The fragment was sent to Australia, where experts identified it as almost certainly a horizontal stabiliser panel from 9M-MRO.

In December 2015, Liam Lotter had found a grey piece of debris on a beach in southern Mozambique, but only after reading in March 2016 about Gibson's find—some 300 km (190 mi) from his own—did his family alert authorities. The piece was flown to Australia for analysis. It carried a stencilled code 676EB, which identified it as part of a Boeing 777 flap track fairing, and the style of lettering matched that of stencils used by Malaysia Airlines, making it almost certain that the part came from 9M-MRO.

The locations where the objects were found are consistent with the drift model performed by CSIRO, further corroborating that the parts could have come from Flight 370.

=== Other debris ===
On 7 March 2016, more debris, possibly from the aircraft, was found on the island of Réunion. Malaysia's deputy transport minister Ab Aziz Kaprawi said that "an unidentified grey item with a blue border" might be linked to Flight 370. Both Malaysian and Australian authorities, coordinating the search in the South Indian Ocean, sent teams to verify whether the debris was from the missing aircraft.

On 21 March 2016, South African archaeologist Neels Kruger found a grey piece of debris on a beach near Mossel Bay, South Africa, that had an unmistakable partial logo of Rolls-Royce, the manufacturer of the missing aircraft's engines. The Malaysian ministry of transport acknowledged that the piece could be that of an engine cowling. An additional piece of possible debris, suggested to have come from the interior of the aircraft, was found on the island of Rodrigues, Mauritius, in late March. On 11 May 2016, Australian authorities determined that the two pieces of debris were "almost certainly" from Flight 370.

=== Flap and further search ===
On 24 June 2016, Australian transport minister Darren Chester said that a piece of aircraft debris had been found on Pemba Island, off the coast of Tanzania. It was handed over to the authorities so that experts from Malaysia could determine its origin. On 20 July, the Australian government released photographs of the piece, which was believed to be an outboard flap from one of the aircraft's wings. Malaysia's transport ministry confirmed on 15 September that the debris was indeed from the missing aircraft.

On 21 November 2016, families of the victims announced that they would carry out a search for debris in December on the island of Madagascar. On 30 November 2018, five pieces of debris recovered between December 2016 and August 2018 on the Malagasy coast, and believed by victims' relatives to be from MH370, were handed to Malaysian transport minister Anthony Loke.

Texas A&M University mathematics professor Goong Chen has argued that the aircraft may have entered the sea vertically; any other angle of entry would make the aircraft splinter into many pieces, which would have been found already.
