= Elong =

Elong may refer to:

- eLong, Chinese travel agency
- Jacques Elong Elong (1981–2025), Cameroonian football player
