= Yilong =

Yilong may refer to:

- Yilong Lake (异龙湖), in Shiping County, Yunnan, China
- Yilong County (仪陇县), of Nanchong, Sichuan, China
- Yilong, Yi'an County (依龙镇), town in Heilongjiang, China
- Yi Long (born 1987), Chinese kickboxer

== See also ==
- eLong
