= Nigel Cawthorne =

British writer (born 1951)

Nigel Cawthorne (born 27 March 1951) is a British freelance writer and editor of both fiction and non-fiction. He is a journalist and specialises in writing about history.

Cawthorne has written for The Guardian, the Daily Mirror, the Daily Mail, and the New-York Tribune. He has appeared on television and BBC Radio 4's Today programme.

== Reception ==
=== Tyrants ===
Ann W. Moore criticised Tyrants in a School Library Journal review of the book:

This chronological look at 55 men and 5 women covers a wide range of geographical areas and time periods, although half the individuals are from the 20th century. Unfortunately, Cawthorne never defines the word "tyrant" or explains his selection process. His list is sure to offend — while all of the featured subjects exercised absolute power, they didn't necessarily do so with nefarious intent, and many are national heroes. Most readers would not mention Peter the Great or Napoleon in the same breath as Stalin, Hitler, or Idi Amin. The further reading is ridiculous, with only one general title, which isn't generally available, and four individual biographies, one on Mao Tse-tung, who isn't even included in the book. There is no introduction or conclusion, and the entries are unbalanced. The author also assumes a vast general knowledge, providing little to no historical context; the result is an often confusing jumble of names, dates, and places. The book contains numerous errors, typos, and internal inconsistencies, and none of the many quotations are footnoted. The few illustrations are primarily unappealing black-and-white reproductions and there are no maps.

=== Jack the Ripper's Secret Confession ===
A review by Publishers Weekly critiqued the book, writing "Television director [David] Monaghan and author Cawthorne (Serial Killers and Mass Murderers ) fail to prove their case that Jack the Ripper, ...and a pseudonymous author known only as “Walter” were one and the same. ...the links Monaghan and Cawthorne try to establish with the Ripper ...are flimsy."

=== Flight MH370: The Mystery ===
The 2014 Flight MH370: The Mystery proposes a conspiracy theory regarding disappearance of Malaysia Airlines Flight 370. The book was fiercely criticised in The Australian by David Free, who described it as an 'information gumbo' that 'reproduces the slapdash atmosphere of the worst kind of 24-hour news show' and advised readers 'Next time you're in one (a shop), buy any book other than this. I guarantee it won't be worse'. The Daily Telegraph reported some relatives of the victims were angered by the book In a May 2014 segment of the Australian television program Today, co-host Karl Stefanovic also took issue with guest Cawthorne. Stefanovic characterized the book as "disgusting" and insensitive to the families.

=== Jeremy Corbyn: Leading from the Left ===
Merryn Williams, writing for the Oxford Left Review, said of the 2015 book Jeremy Corbyn: Leading from the Left, "His book is neither pro nor anti, though it sometimes uses loaded terms like 'moderate' and 'hard left'. It has been unkindly described on Amazon as 'a fleshed-out Wikipedia entry', and there are very many typos, but it does give a fairly accurate account of Jeremy's career up to September 2015. Hardly anything is said, though, about the fascinating subject of exactly how and why he got elected."

== Works ==
=== Series ===
Prisoner of War series

- The Bamboo Cage: The Full Story of the American Servicemen Still Missing in Vietnam (1991)
- The Iron Cage: Are British Prisoners of War Abandoned in Soviet Hands Still Alive in Siberia? (1993)

Sex Lives series

- Sex Lives of the Popes (1996)
- Sex Lives of the US Presidents (1996)
- Sex Lives of the Great Dictators (1996)
- Sex Lives of the Kings and Queens of England (1997)
- Sex Lives of the Hollywood Goddesses (1997)
- Sex Lives of the Hollywood Idols (1997)
- Sex Lives of the Great Artists (1998)
- Sex Lives of the Great Composers (1998)
- Sex Lives of the Hollywood Goddesses 2 (2004)
- Sex Lives of the Famous Gays (2005)
- Sex Lives of the Famous Lesbians (2005)
- Sex Lives of the Roman Emperors (2005)

Old England series

- Strange Laws of Old England (2004)
- Curious Cures of Old England (2005)
- Amorous Antics of Old England (2006)
- Sex Secrets of Old England (2009)

The Art of series

- The Art of Japanese Prints (1997)
- The Art of India (1997)
- The Art of Native North America (1997)
- The Art of the Aztecs (1999)
- The Art of the Icon (2000)

Mammoth Books

- The Mammoth Book of Inside the Elite Forces (2008)
- The Mammoth Book of the Mafia (2009)
- The Mammoth Book of New CSI (2012)
- The Mammoth Book of Sex Scandals (2012)

Brief Histories

- A Brief History of Robin Hood (2010)
- A Brief History of Sherlock Holmes (2011)
- A Brief Guide to James Bond (2012)
- A Brief Guide to Jeeves and Wooster (2013)

Complete Illustrated Encyclopedias

- The Complete Illustrated Encyclopedia of the Lancaster Bomber (2011)
- The Complete Illustrated Encyclopedia of the Spitfire (2011)

=== Other books ===
- Satanic Murder: Chilling True Stories of Sacrificial Slaughter (1995) (Virgin series)
- The New Look: The Dior Revolution (1998)
- The World's Worst Atrocities (1999) (World's Greatest series)
- Serial Killers (1999) (World's Greatest series)
- Takin' Back My Name: The Confessions of Ike Turner (1999) (written with Ike Turner)
- A History of Pirates: Blood and Thunder on the High Seas (2003)
- Witches: History of Persecution (2003))
- Tyrants: History's 100 Most Evil Despots & Dictators (2004)
- Victory: 100 Great Military Commanders (2004)
- Pirates: An Illustrated History (2005)
- The "Who": And the Making of "Tommy" (2005) (Vinyl Frontier series)
- History's Greatest Battles: Masterstrokes of War (2005)
- Alexander the Great (2005) (Life & Times series)
- Victory in World War II: The Allies' Defeat of the Axis Forces (2005)
- Public Executions: From Ancient Rome to the Present Day (2006)
- Heroes: The True Stories Behind Every VC Winner Since World War II (2007)
- Reaping the Whirlwind: Personal Accounts of the German, Japanese and Italian Experiences of World War II (2007)
- Daughter of Heaven: The True Story of the Only Woman to Become Emperor of China (2007)
- World at War (Picture This series) (2008)
- Pirates of the 21st Century: How Modern-Day Buccaneers are Terrorising the World's Oceans (2009)
- Special Forces: War on Terror (2009)
- The World's Most Evil Gangsters (2010)
- Fighting Elites: From the Spartans to the SAS (2010)
- Jack the Ripper's Secret Confession: The Hidden Testimony of Britain's First Serial Killer (2010) (co-written with David Monaghan)
- The Story of the SS: Hitler's Infamous Legions of Death (2011)
- Confirmed Kill: Heroic Sniper Stories from the Jungles of Vietnam to the Mountains of Afghanistan (2011)
- Stalin's Crimes: The Murderous Career of the Red Tsar (2011)
- Warrior Elite: 31 Heroic Special-Ops Missions from the Raid on Son Tay to the Killing of Osama bin Laden (2011)
- Blitzkrieg: Hitler's Masterplan for the Conquest of Europe (2012)
- Canine Commandos: The Heroism, Devotion, and Sacrifice of Dogs in War (2012)
- Shipwrecks: Disasters of the Deep Seas (2013)
- A Short History of World War II: The Greatest Conflict in Human History (2013)
- Tesla: The Life and Times of an Electric Messiah (2014)
- Flight MH370: The Mystery (2014)
- Alan Turing: The Enigma Man (2014)
- Jeremy Corbyn: Leading from the Left (2015)
- Tesla vs Edison: The Life-Long Feud That Electrified The World (2016)
- The Ludicrous Laws of Old London (2016)
- Army of Steel: Tank Warfare 1939-1945 (2017)
- Fighting Them on the Beaches: The D-Day Landings 6 June 1944 (2017)
- Vietnam: A War Lost and Won (2017)
- The Grinning Killer: Chris Halliwell (2018)
- WeToo in the White House: Love, Scandals and Power from Trump to Washington (2018)
- Gypsy King: The Tyson Fury Biography (2019)
- Cults: The World's Most Notorious Cults (2020)
- Prince Andrew: Epstein, Maxwell and the Palace (2020)
- Killer Women: Chilling, Dark and Gripping True Crime Stories of Women Who Kill (2020)
- Outraged of Tunbridge Wells: Original Complaints from Middle England (2020)
- The Battle of Britain: An Illustrated Tribute to the Heroic Few (2020)
- I Don't Believe It! Terrific Outrage from Middle England (2021)
- Assassinations That Changed the World (2021)
