= MH370: The Plane That Disappeared =

2023 Netflix miniseries

- Release poster
- Genre: Reality; Docuseries
- Directed by: Louise Malkinson
- Country of origin: United Kingdom
- Original language: English
- No. of episodes: 3

Production
- Executive producers: Fiona Stourton; Sam Maynard
- Producer: Harry Hewland
- Running time: 91 minutes
- Production company: Raw TV

Original release
- Network: Netflix
- Release: 8 March 2023

MH370: The Plane That Disappeared is a British docuseries released on Netflix and directed by Louise Malkinson about the 2014 disappearance of Malaysia Airlines Flight 370.

The documentary aims to present three contradictory but well documented scenarios of the plane's disappearance. Some reviewers, however, are reported to having taken exception to the series' presentation surrounding the loss of the aircraft. Some suggested that Netflix provided a platform for conspiracy theory proponents.

== Premise ==
On 8 March 2014, Malaysia Airlines Flight 370 and all 239 passengers onboard disappeared without a trace. After ten years, family members, scientists, investigators, and journalists are still actively seeking explanations. The series proposes three mutually contradictory conspiracy theories in an attempt to explain the plane's disappearance.

== Episodes ==
No.	Title	Directed by	Original release date
1	"The Pilot"	Louise Malkinson	8 March 2023
2	"The Hijack"	Louise Malkinson	8 March 2023
3	"The Intercept"	Louise Malkinson	8 March 2023

== Release ==
Netflix began streaming all three episodes of the docuseries on the ninth anniversary of the disappearance, 8 March 2023.

=== Episode removal in Vietnam ===
The deputy spokeswoman of the Vietnamese foreign ministry Phạm Thu Hằng stated that the first episode of the series inaccurately claimed that Vietnam did not cooperate in international efforts to search for the missing plane. She said,

...the documentary MH370: The Plane That Disappeared ... does not accurately reflect the efforts of the Vietnamese authorities, causing discontent in the Vietnamese public opinion. We ask that the producers and filmmakers accurately portray Vietnam's contributions in the search and rescue for the plane and to remove or amend inaccurate information."

Hằng stressed that in the immediate aftermath of the disappearance of the airliner, in March 2014 the Vietnamese authorities prepared a response plan, shared information, coordinated with Malaysia and other countries to conduct a wide-scale search and rescue. Vietnam sent ships and planes along with personnel to join the search with international forces in its waters. These efforts were acknowledged by the international community and reported on by the press in Vietnam and abroad.

On 13 April 2023, Netflix removed the first episode of the docuseries from its service in Vietnam.

== Reception ==
Rohan Naahar of The Indian Express called the series "a cruel joke, really, and very disrespectful to the people who lost family members in the tragedy", considering it to have "the tone and texture of a reality show".

Nick Schager of The Daily Beast said the series details 3 "dubious" explanations for the plane's disappearance, and "wallows in murky and absurd waters" but provides "illuminating context for why some chose to believe the unbelievable".

Meera Suresh of The Week said the series was "A lame attempt that pushes conspiracy theories", reporting that "the biggest of all the mysteries would be why Netflix offered these theorists a platform to peddle their illogical, unscientific and outlandish ideas. This three-part docuseries is nothing but a podium for baseless theories offering cheap thrill at the cost of the poor souls who went missing and their relatives." The review also pointed out problems with the conspiracy theories highlighted in each episode, as follows:

- Episode 1: "...the docuseries shows no such mercy as Zaharie [the pilot] is brutally dissected here for purposefully crashing the plane, all with no proof."
- Episode 2: "...nothing can salvage the illogical conspiracy theory offered by Jeff Wise as his "idea that the flight was hijacked by Russians...from the electronics bay...is preposterous."
- Episode 3: "So offensive and galling" is [French journalist Florence de Changy's] theory that U.S. jets shot down the flight, that "it feels somehow disrespectful to have led [sic] an ear to it."

Richard Roeper of the Chicago Sun-Times called the series compelling, concluding its review with "So many of the theories we see explored in MH370: The Plane That Disappeared are outlandish, not fully formed, difficult to believe. And yet... we know something bizarre and tragic occurred."

Philip Sledge of CinemaBlend reported that "while you shouldn’t go in expecting a great deal of answers, the questions posed throughout add a level of intrigue to the mysterious story." It also said that the series rating of TV-14 differs from most true crime documentaries on Netflix due to mature themes and language.

Joel Keller of Decider said the conspiracy theories presented "are well-presented, with [investigative reporter Jeff Wise] being the 'expert' that anchors all of those theories into some aspect of reality." It concluded "your enjoyment of this docuseries is really going to hinge on whether you bought into the theories posited by [investigative reporter] Wise, his fellow journalists and aviation experts. That’s really the only way that the viewing experience doesn’t become a frustrating rabbit hole of conspiracy theories and little else."

In a Skeptical Inquirer online review, JD Sword details the flaws in the series, and describes some of the people highlighted in the episodes as "storytellers shamelessly profiting off tragedy and pushing baseless conspiracy theories." Sword concludes that the series is not solving a mystery, but just "telling a never-ending story".

== See also ==
- Malaysia Airlines Flight 370 disappearance theories
