= Ranee Brylinski =

American mathematician (1957–2026)

Ranee Kathryn Brylinski (née Gupta, January 28, 1957 – September 9, 2026) was an American mathematician known for her research in representation theory and quantum logic gates. Originally a professor of mathematics at Pennsylvania State University, she left academia in 2003 to found the mathematical consulting company Brylinski Research with her husband, Jean-Luc Brylinski.

== Early life and career ==
Brylinski was born in Detroit, Michigan, on January 28, 1957. She graduated from Princeton University in 1977, and completed her Ph.D. at the Massachusetts Institute of Technology (MIT) in 1981. Her dissertation, Abelian Algebras and Adjoint Orbits, was supervised by Steven Kleiman.

After a year as an NSF Mathematical Sciences Postdoctoral Fellow at MIT, she joined the faculty at Brown University as Tamarkin Assistant Professor of Mathematics in 1982. She moved from Brown to Pennsylvania State University in 1988. At Pennsylvania State, she was co-director of the Center for Geometry and Mathematical Physics.

== Contributions ==
The Brylinski–Kostant filtration of weight spaces is named after her. She originally developed this filtration in 1989, motivated by earlier work of Bertram Kostant.^{[LWS]} She is also known for Brylinski's theorem, a theorem from her dissertation on the closures of orbits of algebraic groups.

Another result, also called "Brylinski's theorem", comes from a paper written jointly by Brylinski and her husband, characterizing universal quantum logic gates.^{[UQG]}

== Death ==
Brylinski died on September 9, 2026, at the age of 69.

== Recognition ==
Brylinski won a Sloan Research Fellowship in 1990. In 1998, she won the G. de B. Robinson Award of the Canadian Mathematical Society for her work on quantization of algebraic groups.^{[Q4D]}

== Selected publications ==
With Goong Chen, Brylinski is the editor of the book Mathematics of Quantum Computation (Chapman & Hall/CRC, 2002). She is also one of the editors of Lie Theory and Geometry: In Honor of Bertram Kostant (Springer, 1994) and Advances in Geometry (Springer, 1999).

Her research papers include:

| LWS. | Brylinski, Ranee Kathryn (1989), "Limits of weight spaces, Lusztig's $q$-analogs, and fiberings of adjoint orbits", Journal of the American Mathematical Society, 2 (3): 517–533, doi:10.2307/1990941, JSTOR 1990941, MR 0984511, S2CID 11590624 |

| Q4D. | Brylinski, Ranee (1997), "Quantization of the 4-dimensional nilpotent orbit of $\mathrm{SL}(3,\mathbb{R})$", Canadian Journal of Mathematics, 49 (5): 916–943, doi:10.4153/CJM-1997-048-0, MR 1604118 |

| UQG. | Brylinski, Jean-Luc; Brylinski, Ranee (2002), "Universal quantum gates", Mathematics of Quantum Computation, Comput. Math. Ser., Boca Raton, FL: Chapman & Hall/CRC, pp. 101–116, MR 2007944 |
