= Flight MH370: The Mystery =

2014 book by Nigel Cawthorne

Flight MH370: The Mystery (Vanished)
- Author: Nigel Cawthorne
- Language: English
- Subject: Disappearance of MH370
- Genre: Conspiracy theories
- Published: London
- Publisher: John Blake Publishing, Tim Matapura
- Publication date: 2014
- Publication place: United Kingdom
- Pages: 246
- ISBN: 978-1-78418-112-3
- Dewey Decimal: 363.1241

Flight MH370: The Mystery is a 2014 book by the American-born-British author Nigel Cawthorne concerning the disappearance of Malaysia Airlines Flight 370.

== Synopsis ==
The book is critical of official accounts of the disappearance of Malaysia Airlines Flight 370, noting 'In a world where we can be tracked by our mobile phones, CCTV and spy cameras, things do not just disappear. Especially not a big thing like a jumbo jet'. The book questions alleged failure by governments and organisations to share information concerning Flight MH370. The author suggests a cover up has occurred because the United States Military shot down the plane during military exercises in the region.

== Reception ==
The book was fiercely criticised in The Australian by David Free, who described it as an 'information gumbo' that 'reproduces the slapdash atmosphere of the worst kind of 24-hour news show' and advised readers 'Next time you're in one (a shop), buy any book other than this. I guarantee it won't be worse' while The Daily Telegraph reported some relatives of the victims were angered by the book

In a May 2014 segment of the Australian television program Today, co-host Karl Stefanovic also took issue with guest Cawthorne.“You write in the book: ‘They’ll never be sure, the families, what happened to their loved ones. Did they die painlessly unaware of their fate or did they die in terror in a flaming wreck crashing from the sky at the hands of a madman?’ Stefanovic characterized the book as "disgusting" and insensitive to the families. When asked "why would you write the book?", the author replied, “I’m afraid it’s what I do for a living."
