= Goong Chen =

Mathematician

Goong Chen (Chinese: 陳鞏, born July 7, 1950, Kaohsiung, Taiwan) is a Taiwanese applied mathematician known for his use of computer forensics and computer simulation to recreate what may have occurred in aviation accidents. He is currently a professor of mathematics at Texas A&M University.

== Malaysia Airlines Flight 370 ==
Chen led an interdisciplinary team of researchers from Texas A&M, Penn State, Virginia Tech, MIT and the Qatar Environment and Energy Research Institute in using applied mathematics and computational fluid dynamics to conduct computer simulations of Malaysia Airlines Flight 370’s presumed descent into the ocean. In a paper published in April 2015, they concluded that the most likely scenario was that the plane entered the water at a vertical or steep angle, based on the lack of floating debris or oil spills. This finding was deemed a top math story of 2015 by the American Mathematical Society after widespread media coverage.

== Khan Shaykhun chemical attack ==
Chen collaborated with Theodore Postol on an analysis of the April 4, 2017, chemical attack on Khan Shaykhun, Syria. The OPCW-UN Joint Investigative Mechanism had concluded that the Khan Shaykhun impact crater was caused by an aerial bomb dropped by a plane, but Chen’s simulations suggested that the crater could instead have been created by a 122 mm artillery rocket.

== Smolensk air disaster ==
In 2019, Poland’s National Prosecutor’s Office announced that it had appointed Chen to an international team of experts investigating the April 10, 2010, crash of a Polish Air Force jet near Smolensk, Russia, in which Polish president Lech Kaczyński was killed.

== Selected publications ==
With Ranee Brylinski, Chen is the editor of the book Mathematics of Quantum Computation (Chapman & Hall/CRC, 2002, ISBN 978-1584888994).
