= Florence de Changy =

French journalist

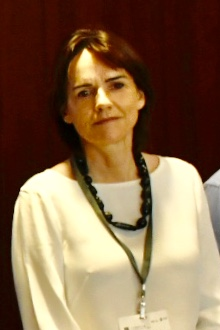
de Changy in 2019

Florence de Changy (born 1966) is a French journalist and author. Based in the Asia-Pacific region since the early 1990s, she is a correspondent for Le Monde, Radio France, and RFI. She is known for her in-depth investigations into the disappearance of flight MH370.

She was awarded the French Ordre National du Mérite for services to journalism in 2018.

== Biography ==
De Changy began her journalistic career in 1991 in the Asia-Pacific region. She has been a correspondent in Sydney, Auckland, Kuala Lumpur, Taipei, and is currently based in Hong Kong.

Since 1994, she has worked as a correspondent for Le Monde and also collaborates with Radio France and RFI. She covers political, economic, and social news from the Asia-Pacific region, including China, Hong Kong, Taiwan, and Southeast Asia.

She was previously President of the Foreign Correspondents' Club (Hong Kong), which brings together all foreign press correspondents in Hong Kong.

== MH370 Investigation ==
Since 2014, she has reported extensively from Kuala Lumpur on the disappearance of Malaysia Airlines Flight 370.

She subsequently conducted an independent investigation. According to her research, the aircraft was carrying sensitive cargo and may have been deliberately intercepted under unclear circumstances. Her hypothesis of military intervention involving the United States Air Force is counter to the official conclusions. Her findings were published in two books in 2021: La Disparition (in French) and The Disappearing Act (in English). The English version was published by HarperCollins.

== Publications ==
- La Disparition, Éditions Les Arènes, 2021. ISBN 9791037503831
- The Disappearing Act: The Impossible Case of MH370, HarperCollins, 2021. ISBN 978-0-00-838154-7
