= ELong =

Chinese online travel agency

eLong, Inc.
- Type: Public
- Traded as: Nasdaq: LONG
- Industry: Travel agency
- Founded: 1999; 27 years ago
- Headquarters: Beijing, China
- Website: www.elong.net

eLong, Inc. (Chinese: 艺龙; pinyin: Yìlóng) is a Chinese mobile and online travel agency, which runs the eponymous eLong.com and eLong.net travel website.
