= Malaysia Airlines Flight 370 =

2014 aircraft disappearance

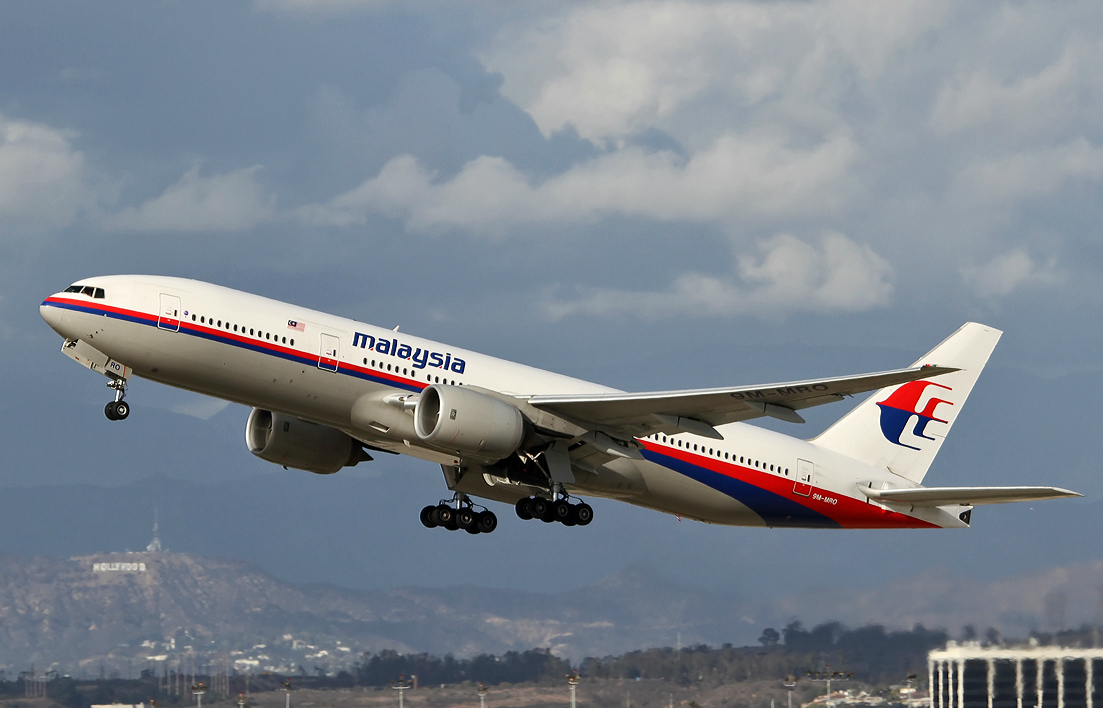
- 9M-MRO, the aircraft involved in the disappearance, pictured in 2013

Disappearance
- Date: 8 March 2014
- Summary: Inconclusive, some debris found
- Site: Southern Indian Ocean

Aircraft
- Aircraft type: Boeing 777-2H6ER (Note: The aircraft was a Boeing 777–200 (Extended Range "ER") model; Boeing assigns a unique code for each company that buys one of its aircraft, which is applied as an infix to the model number at the time the aircraft is built, hence "777-2H6(ER)" designates a 777-200ER built for Malaysia Airlines (customer code H6).)
- Operator: Malaysia Airlines
- IATA flight No.: MH370
- ICAO flight No.: MAS370
- Call sign: MALAYSIAN 370
- Registration: 9M-MRO
- Flight origin: Kuala Lumpur International Airport, Sepang District, Malaysia
- Destination: Beijing Capital International Airport, Beijing, China
- Occupants: 239
- Passengers: 227
- Crew: 12
- Fatalities: 239
- Survivors: 0

Malaysia Airlines Flight 370 (MH370 / MAS370) was an international passenger flight from Kuala Lumpur International Airport in Malaysia to Beijing Capital International Airport in China. On 8 March 2014, the Boeing 777 operating on the route disappeared from radar with 227 passengers and 12 crew members on board. Although the cause of its disappearance has not been determined, it has been established that the aircraft was diverted manually (Note: Investigators could not reproduce the turn back at IGARI within the time shown by radar data using autopilot. They concluded that the manoeuvre would have necessitated autopilot off.) but it is unknown by whom or why. It is widely regarded as the greatest mystery in aviation history.

The crew of the aircraft last communicated with air traffic control (ATC) around 38 minutes after takeoff while flying over the South China Sea. The aircraft was lost from ATC's secondary surveillance radar screens minutes later, but was tracked by the Malaysian military's primary radar system for another hour as it manually deviated westward from its planned flight path. It left radar range 200 nautical miles (370 km; 230 mi) west-northwest of Penang Island in northwestern Peninsular Malaysia.

Relying mostly on the analysis of data from the Inmarsat satellite with which the aircraft last communicated, the Australian Transport Safety Bureau (ATSB) initially proposed that a hypoxia event was the most likely cause given the available evidence, although no consensus has been reached among investigators concerning this theory. At various stages of the investigation, possible hijacking scenarios were considered, including crew involvement, and suspicion of the aircraft's cargo manifest. Many disappearance theories regarding the flight have also been reported by the media.

With all 227 passengers and 12 crew aboard presumed dead, the disappearance of Flight 370 was the deadliest incident involving a Boeing 777, the deadliest of 2014, and the deadliest in Malaysia Airlines' history until it was surpassed in all three regards by Malaysia Airlines Flight 17 on 17 July 2014.

The search for the missing aircraft became the most expensive search in aviation history at US$135–160 million. It focused initially on the South China Sea and Andaman Sea, before a novel analysis of the aircraft's automated communications with an Inmarsat satellite indicated that the aircraft had travelled far southward over the southern Indian Ocean. Several pieces of debris washed ashore in the western Indian Ocean during 2015 and 2016; many of these were confirmed to have originated from Flight 370. After a three-year search across 120,000 km^{2} (46,000 sq mi) of ocean failed to locate the aircraft, the Joint Agency Coordination Centre heading the operation suspended its activities in January 2017. A second search launched in January 2018 by private contractor Ocean Infinity also ended without success after six months. The Malaysian Ministry of Transport's final report from July 2018 was inconclusive.

In the absence of a definitive cause of disappearance, air transport industry safety recommendations and regulations citing Flight 370 have been implemented to prevent a repetition of the circumstances associated with the loss. These include increased battery life on underwater locator beacons, lengthening of recording times on flight data recorders and cockpit voice recorders, and new standards for aircraft position reporting over open ocean.

== Background ==
Interior photographs of 9M-MRO (Note: from April 2004)

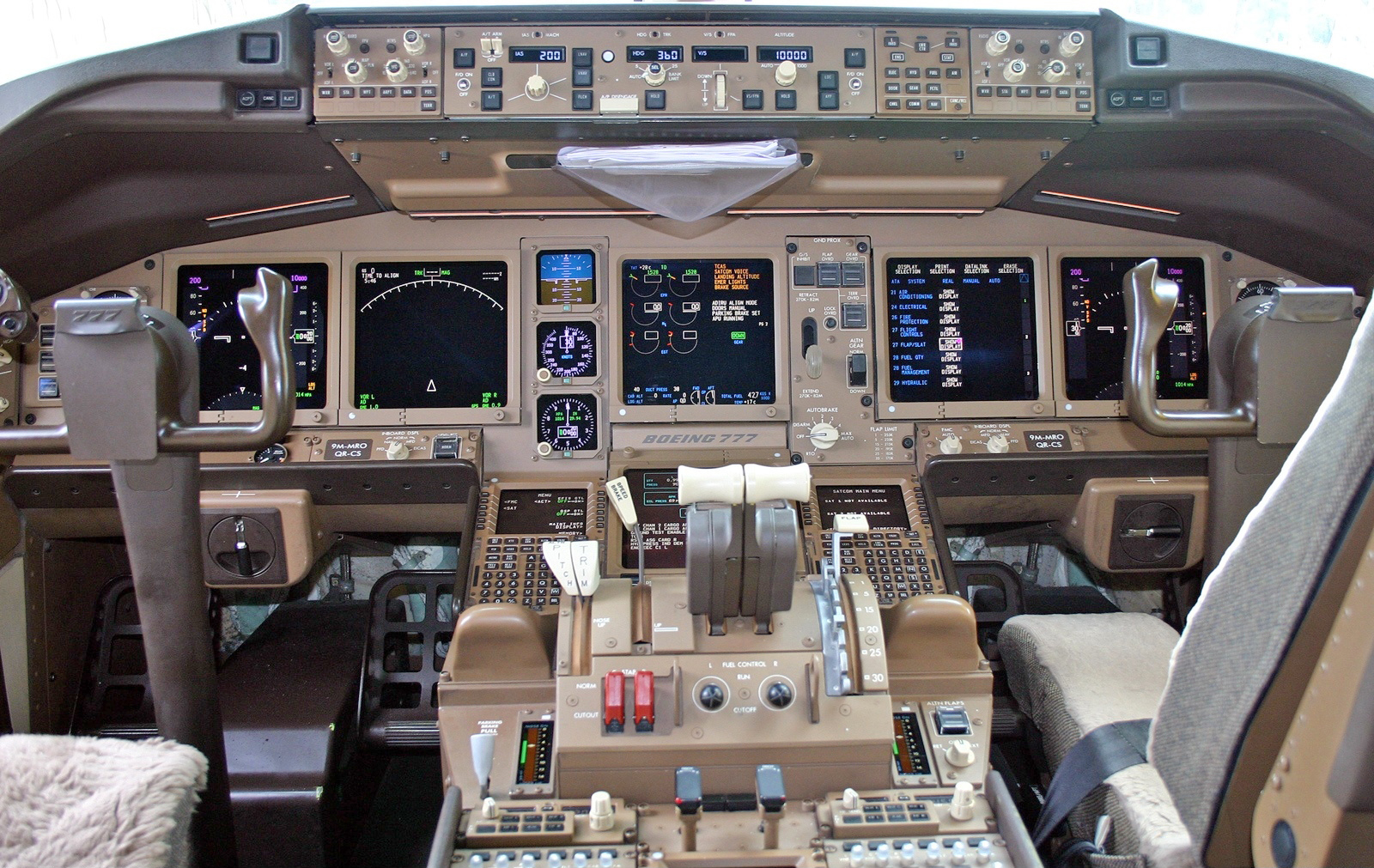
Cockpit

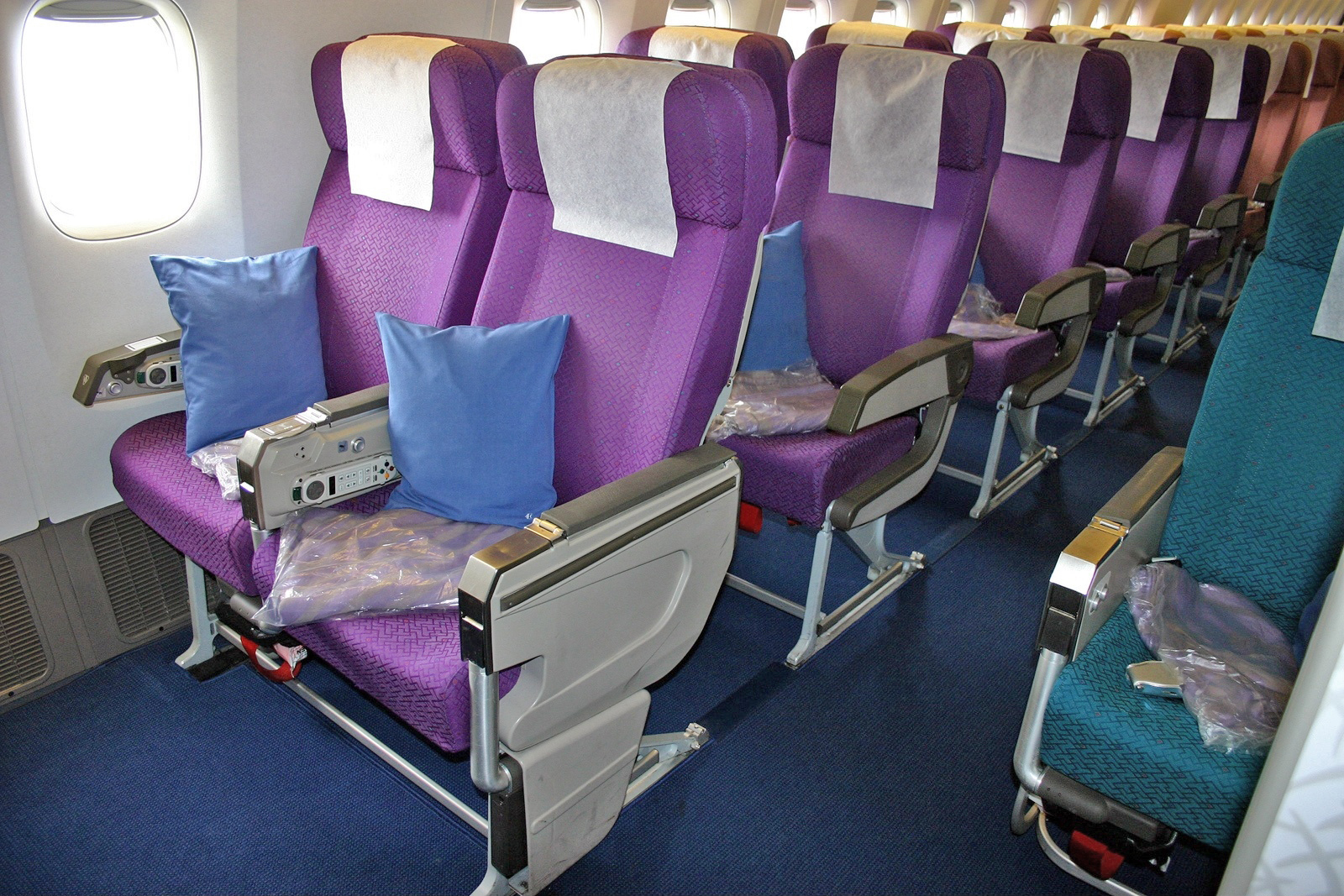
Economy class seats

=== Aircraft ===
Flight 370 was operated by a Boeing 777-2H6ER, (Note: The aircraft is a Boeing 777-200ER (for Extended Range) model; Boeing assigns a unique customer code for each company that buys one of its aircraft, which replaces part of the model number at the time the aircraft is built. The code for Malaysia Airlines is "H6", hence "777-2H6ER".) serial number 28420, registered as 9M-MRO. The aircraft was delivered new to Malaysia Airlines on 31 May 2002. It was powered by two Rolls-Royce Trent 892 engines and configured to carry 282 passengers in total capacity. It had accumulated 53,471.6 hours and 7,526 cycles (takeoffs and landings) in service and had not previously been involved in any major incidents, though a minor incident while taxiing at Shanghai Pudong International Airport in August 2012 resulted in a broken wing tip. Its last maintenance "A check" was carried out on 23 February 2014. The aircraft was in compliance with all applicable airworthiness directives for the airframe and engines. Replenishment of the crew member oxygen system (a routine maintenance task) was performed on 7 March 2014; an examination of this procedure found nothing unusual. In a 2024 story published without attribution or information about the source, The Standard reported that ten years after MH370's disappearance, "leaked documents" showed that MH370 was given supplemental fuel and crew member oxygen supplies just before takeoff. Passenger oxygen systems can generate about 12 to 15 minutes of supplemental oxygen. Crew oxygen, which is a separate system, allows for several hours of use.

The Boeing 777 was introduced in 1994 and has an excellent safety record. Since its first commercial flight in June 1995, the type has suffered only six other hull losses.

=== Crew and passengers ===
Nationality	Count
Australia	6
Canada	2
China	153 (Note: Including one Hong Kong resident.)
France	4
India	5
Indonesia	7
Iran	2 (Note: The manifest initially released by Malaysia Airlines listed an Austrian and an Italian. These were subsequently identified as two Iranian nationals who boarded Flight 370 using stolen passports.)
Malaysia	50 (Note: 38 passengers and 12 crew.)
Netherlands	1
New Zealand	2
Russia	1
Taiwan	1
Ukraine	2
United States	3
Total	239

The aircraft was carrying 12 Malaysian crew members and 227 passengers from 14 different nations. On the day of the disappearance, Malaysia Airlines released the names and nationalities of the crew and passengers, based on the flight manifest. The passenger list was later modified to include two Iranian passengers travelling on stolen passports. All 12 crew members were Malaysian citizens.

The pilot in command was 52-year-old Captain Zaharie Ahmad Shah from Penang. He joined Malaysia Airlines as a cadet pilot in 1981, and after training and receiving his commercial pilot's license, he became a second officer with the airline in 1983. He was promoted to captain of the Boeing 737-400 in 1991, captain of the Airbus A330-300 in 1996, and captain of the Boeing 777-200 in 1998. He had been a type-rating instructor and a type-rating examiner since 2007. Zaharie had a total of 18,365 hours of flying experience.

The co-pilot was 26-year-old First Officer Fariq Abdul Hamid. He joined Malaysia Airlines as a cadet pilot in 2007; after becoming a second officer of the Boeing 737–400, he was promoted to first officer of the Boeing 737–400 in 2010 and then transitioned to the Airbus A330-300 in 2012. In November 2013, he began training as first officer of the Boeing 777–200 aircraft. Flight 370 was his final training flight, and he was scheduled to be examined on his next flight. Fariq had accumulated 2,763 hours of flying experience.

Of the 227 passengers, 153 were Chinese citizens, including a group of 19 artists with six family members and four staff returning from a calligraphy exhibition of their work in Kuala Lumpur. There were 38 Malaysian passengers with the remaining passengers being from 12 other countries. Twenty passengers, 12 of whom were from Malaysia and eight from China, were employees of Freescale Semiconductor.

== Flight ==
Flight 370's recorded flight path, based on civilian and military radar data.

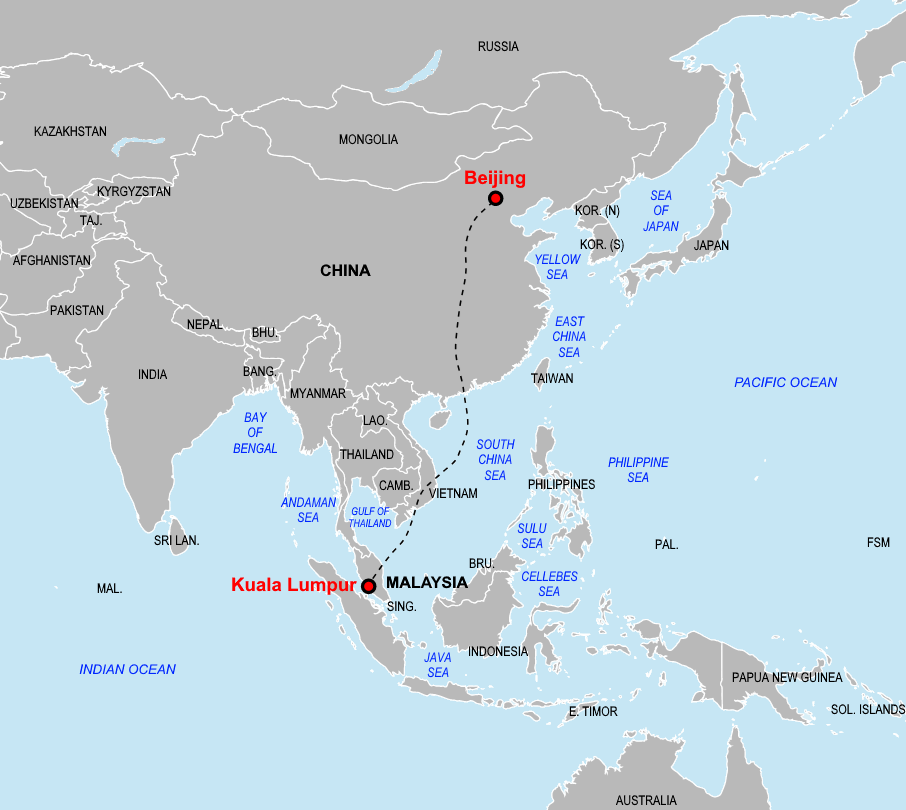
Map showing the scheduled flightpath and the surrounding region

Malaysia Airlines Flight 370 (MH370/MAS370) was an International passenger flight that departed Kuala Lumpur International Airport at 00:42 (UTC+08:00) on 8 March 2014, heading to Beijing Capital International Airport, carrying 227 passengers and 12 crew members. The aircraft climbed to its assigned cruising altitude of approximately 35,000 feet (10,700 m) and proceeded towards the waypoint IGARI over the South China Sea.

At 01:19:30, the crew acknowledged instructions to contact air traffic controllers in Ho Chi Minh City with the words, "Good night Malaysian Three Seven Zero." The crew did not establish radio contact with Ho Chi Minh controllers. This was the last recorded radio transmission from the aircraft. At 01:21:13, shortly passing IGARI, the aircraft disappeared from secondary surveillance radar—which relies on signals from the aircraft's transponder—and was manually flown through a sharp sustained left turn lasting approximately 2 minutes and 10 seconds. Investigators concluded that the turn was performed with the autopilot off, as simulator trials could not recreate the manoeuvre within that time using autopilot.

Malaysian military primary radar continued to track the aircraft as it turned back across the Malay Peninsula, passed south of Penang Island and headed northwest along the Strait of Malacca. The final military radar detection was at 02:22:12, beyond waypoint MEKAR. The military identified the aircraft as friendly and did not intercept it.

At 01:38, Ho Chi Minh controllers contacted Kuala Lumpur to report that they had not established communication with Flight 370. Later enquiries were complicated by information from Malaysia Airlines placing the aircraft in Cambodian airspace. At 03:30, the airline explained that its reported positions were projections rather than confirmed locations. Kuala Lumpur's Aeronautical Rescue Coordination Centre was activated at 05:30, while the aircraft was still airborne.

At 07:24, Malaysia Airlines announced that contact with Flight 370 had been lost and that search-and-rescue operations had begun. Its initial statement initially gave the time of lost contact as 02:40; this was later corrected to 01:21. Unknown to anyone, the aircraft was still airborne over the Indian Ocean while the search was ongoing in the South China Sea.

On 24 March, Malaysian prime minister Najib Razak announced that satellite analysis placed the flight's end in the southern Indian Ocean. Although radio contact was not restored, the aircraft's satellite communications system logged on to the Inmarsat network at 02:25. It subsequently exchanged automated signals with a ground station and received two unanswered calls to the cockpit. Its last transmission was recorded at 08:19:37; it did not respond to further contact attempts beginning at 09:15.

On 29 January 2015, Malaysia formally declared the disappearance an accident under annexes 12 and 13 of the Chicago Convention and stated that all 239 people aboard were presumed dead.

== Search ==
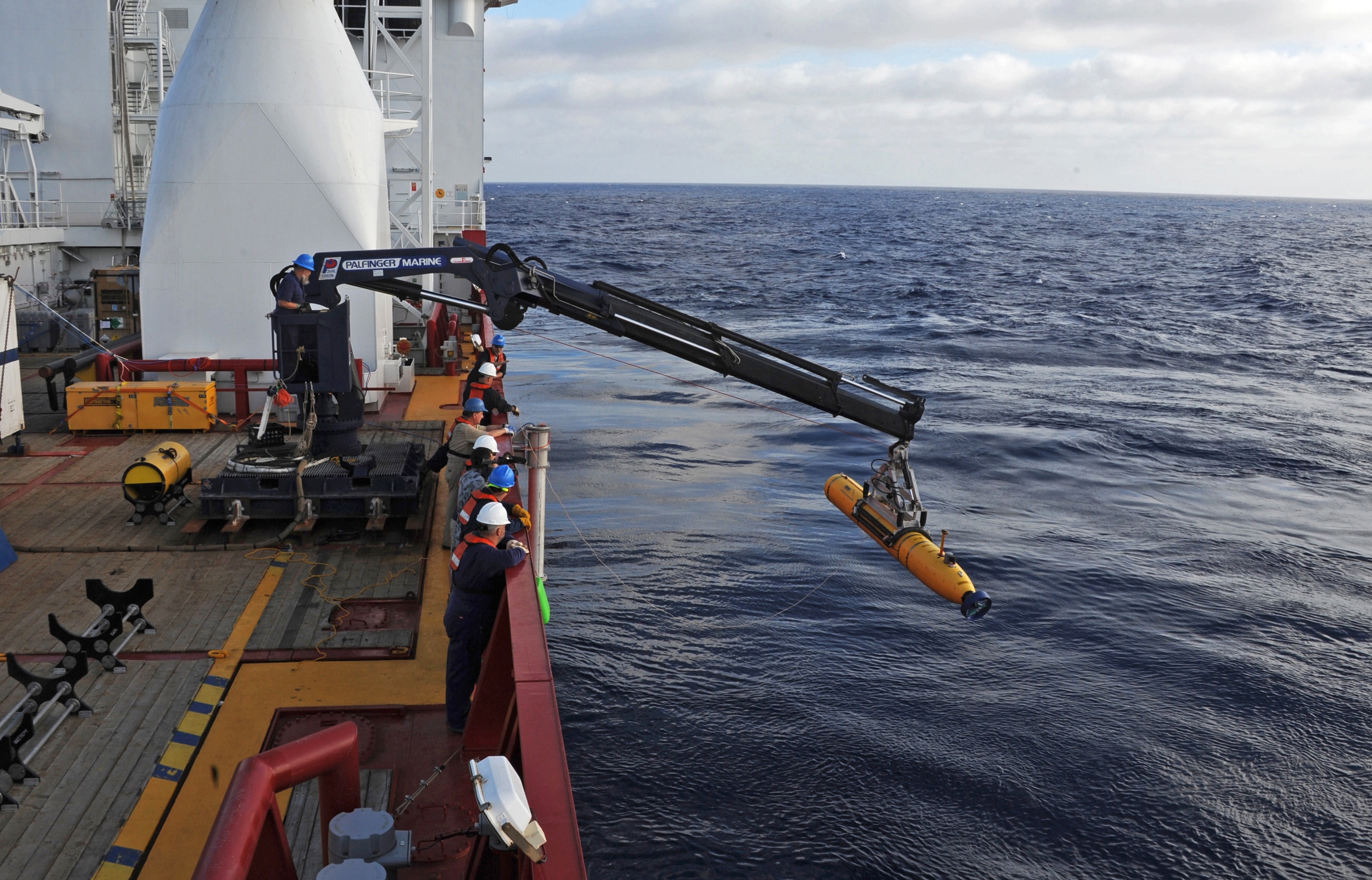
ADV Ocean Shield deploys the Bluefin-21 autonomous underwater vehicle, which conducted the seafloor sonar survey from 14 April to 28 May 2014.

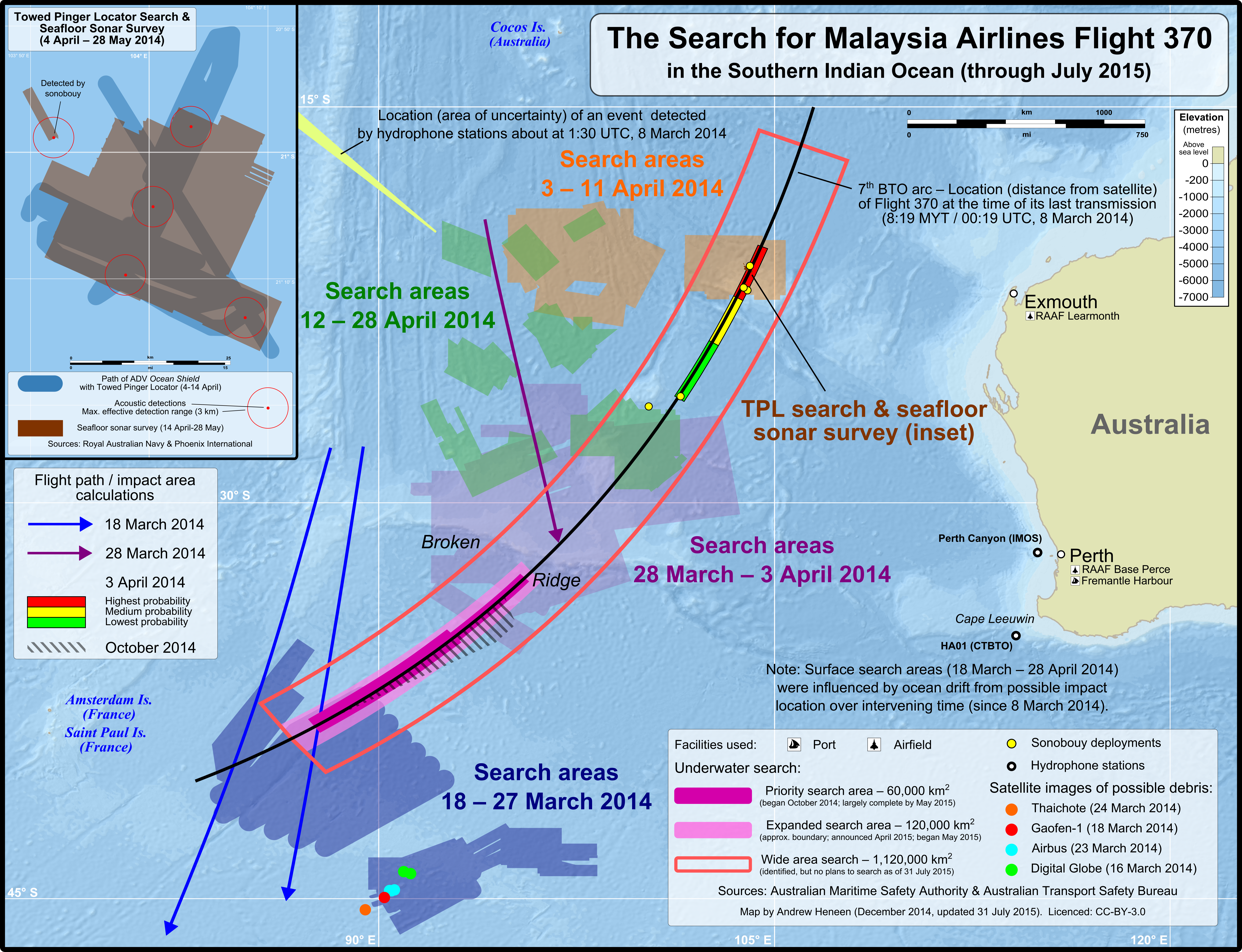
The shifting search zones for Flight 370 in the Southern Indian Ocean. The inset shows the path of taken by the vessel ADV Ocean Shield operating a towed pinger locator, acoustic detections, and the sonar search.

The multinational search immediately focused on the South China Sea and Strait of Malacca, while the aircraft was still airborne over the Indian Ocean. Analysis of the aircraft's satellite communications shifted the search to the southern Indian Ocean, where Australia assumed responsibility at Malaysia's request on 17 March 2014. Searches by aircraft and ships, followed by attempts to detect the underwater locator beacons attached to the flight recorders, found no wreckage or signals attributable to Flight 370.

An underwater search led by the Australian Transport Safety Bureau, with support from Malaysia and China, surveyed more than 120,000 km^{2} (46,000 sq mi) of seabed. The three governments suspended it on 17 January 2017 after the aircraft was not found. In January 2018, Ocean Infinity began another search on a "no find, no fee" basis, which also ended without locating the aircraft.

Ocean Infinity resumed searching in February 2025, with a new agreement covering 15,000 km^{2} (5,800 sq mi) of the southern Indian Ocean on a "no find, no fee" basis. After a seasonal suspension, operations resumed in December but ended on 23 January 2026 without locating the aircraft. On 29 June 2026, Malaysia announced that the agreement had been extended until 30 June 2027 to allow the remaining search area to be surveyed.

== Marine debris ==
Location of flaperon discovery relative to Flight 370's flight path and the main search area

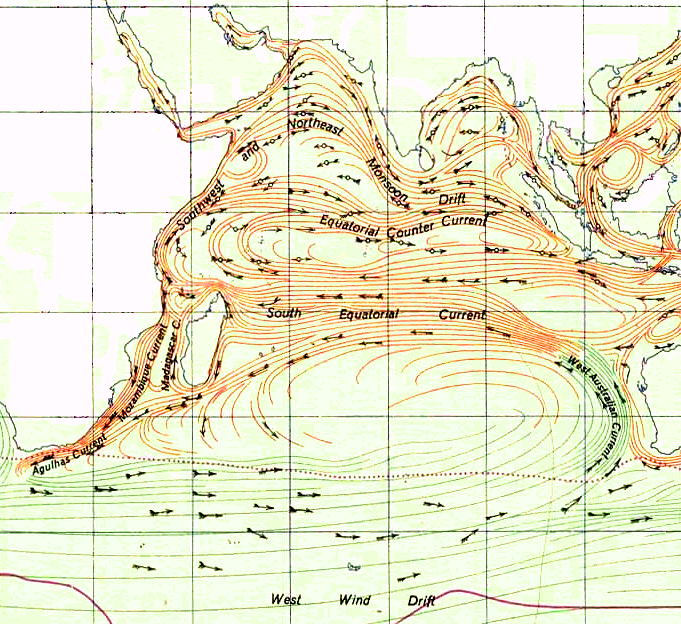
Currents within the Indian Ocean

On 29 July 2015, more than sixteen months after the disappearance, a right flaperon was found washed ashore on Réunion, a French island in the western Indian Ocean. It was transported to Toulouse for examination by French investigators. Although its identification plate was missing, numbers on its internal components were traced to manufacturing records, confirming that it belonged to 9M-MRO. It was the first recovered wreckage positively identified as coming from Flight 370.

Further aircraft debris was recovered from beaches off the coasts of Mozambique, South Africa, Mauritius, Tanzania and Madagascar. Two pieces found in Mozambique in December 2015 and February 2016 were identified as a flap support fairing and a horizontal stabiliser panel. Their construction, dimensions and markings indicated that they were almost certainly from Flight 370. Part of a engine cowling found on the South African coast, and a cabin interior panel found on Rodrigues were analyzed as almost certainly from Flight 370. The cowling's Rolls-Royce stencil corresponded with those used by Malaysia Airlines, while the interior panel's decorative laminate matched material specified by the airline.. A section of the left outboard flap recovered in Mauritius and part of the right outboard flap found on Pemba Island, Tanzania, were conclusively linked to 9M-MRO through manufacturing records. By the publication of Malaysia's 2018 report on the flight, investigators had examined 27 significant items of debris: three were confirmed as belonging to Flight 370 and seven others were assessed as almost certainly from it.

The Malaysian investigation concluded that the right outboard flap was most likely retracted, and the flaperon was probably at or near its neutral position when they separated from the wing. Cabin interior debris suggested that the aircraft had broken up, although investigators could not determine whether this occurred in flight or on impact with the ocean. Aircraft accident investigator Larry Vance disputes this interpretation of the flap damage, arguing instead that the aircraft had entered the water under power with its flaps extended.

== Investigation ==
=== International participation ===
Malaysia quickly assembled a Joint Investigation Team (JIT), consisting of specialists from Malaysia, China, the United Kingdom, the United States, and France, which was led in accordance with ICAO standards by "an independent investigator in charge". The team consisted of an airworthiness group, an operations group, and a medical and human factors group. The airworthiness group were tasked with examining issues relating to maintenance records, structures, and systems of the aircraft; the operations group were to review the flight recorders, operations, and meteorology; and the medical and human factors group would investigate psychological, pathological, and survival factors. Malaysia also announced, on 6 April 2014, that it had set up three ministerial committees: a Next of Kin Committee, a committee to organise the formation of the JIT, and a committee responsible for the Malaysian assets deployed in the search effort. The criminal investigation was led by the Royal Malaysia Police, assisted by Interpol and other relevant international law enforcement authorities.

On 17 March, Australia took control of co-ordinating the search, rescue, and recovery operations. For the next six weeks, the Australian Maritime Safety Authority (AMSA) and ATSB worked to determine the search area, correlating information with the JIT and other government and academic sources, while the Joint Agency Coordination Centre (JACC) coordinated the search efforts. Following the fourth phase of the search, the ATSB took responsibility for defining the search area. In May, a search strategy working group was established by the ATSB to determine the most likely position of the aircraft at the 00:19 UTC (08:19 MYT) satellite transmission. The working group included aircraft and satellite experts from: Air Accidents Investigation Branch (UK), Boeing (US), Defence Science and Technology Group (Note: The agency's name changed on 1 July 2015. It was previously known as the Defence Science and Technology Organisation.) (Australia), Department of Civil Aviation (Malaysia), Inmarsat (UK), National Transportation Safety Board (US), and Thales (France).

As of October 2018, France was the only country that was continuing the investigation (by means of its Air Transport Gendarmerie), with the intention of verifying all of the technical data transmitted, particularly those provided by Inmarsat.

In 2024, researchers at Cardiff University in the United Kingdom conducted a study on underwater hydrophone signals generated by aircraft crashes in the ocean. The researchers claimed that these signals could be key to detecting the final resting place of MH370, potentially bringing the UK back into the search efforts.

=== Interim and final reports ===
Two interim reports were issued in 8 March 2015, and March 2016. They contained factual information about the aircraft but no analysis. The final report from the Australian Transport Safety Bureau, published on 3 October 2017, was 440 pages and called for large aircraft to be equipped with more precise flight-tracking technology. The final report from the Malaysian Ministry of Transport, was 1,500 pages, released on 30 July 2018. It confirmed that the aircraft was manually taken off its assigned flight path just after 01:00 MYT, "either by the pilot or a third party" and that the aircraft was undetected by traffic control radar for twenty minutes before anyone was alerted. Following these accounts of air traffic control failings, the Chairman of the Civil Aviation Authority of Malaysia, Azharuddin Abdul Rahman, resigned on 31 July 2018.

=== Analysis of satellite communication ===
The communications between Flight 370 and the satellite communication network operated by Inmarsat, which were relayed by the Inmarsat-3 F1 satellite, provide the only significant clues to the location of Flight 370 after disappearing from Malaysian military radar at 02:22 MYT. These communications have also been used to infer possible in-flight events. The investigative team was challenged with reconstructing the flight path of Flight 370 from a limited set of transmissions with no explicit information about the aircraft's location, heading, or speed.

==== Technical background ====
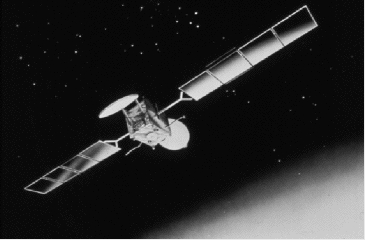
A depiction of an Inmarsat-3 series satellite. Flight 370 was in contact with Inmarsat-3 F1 (also known as "IOR" for Indian Ocean Region).

Aeronautical satellite communication (SATCOM) systems are used to transmit messages sent from the aircraft cockpit, as well as automated data signals from onboard equipment, using the ACARS communications protocol. SATCOM may also be used for the transmission of FANS and ATN messages, and for providing voice, fax and data links using other protocols. The aircraft uses a satellite data unit (SDU) to send and receive signals over the satellite communications network; this operates independently from the other onboard systems that communicate via SATCOM, mostly using the ACARS protocol. Signals from the SDU are transmitted to a communications satellite, which amplifies the signal and changes its frequency before relaying it to a ground station, where the signal is processed and, if applicable, routed to its intended destination (e.g. Malaysia Airlines' operations centre); signals are sent from the ground to the aircraft in reverse order.

When the SDU is first powered on, it attempts to connect with the Inmarsat network by transmitting a log-on request, which is acknowledged by the ground station. This is partly to determine whether the SDU belongs to an active service subscriber, and also to identify which satellite should be used for transmitting messages to the SDU. After connecting, if no further contact has been received from the data terminal (the SDU) for one hour, (Note: The timing of the log-on interrogation message is determined by an inactivity timer, which was set to one hour at the time of Flight 370's disappearance (it was later reduced to 15 minutes).) the ground station transmits a "log-on interrogation" message, commonly referred to as a "ping"; if the terminal is active, it will respond to the ping automatically. The entire process of interrogating the terminal is referred to as a "handshake".

==== SDU communications ====
Although the ACARS data link on Flight 370 stopped functioning between 01:07 and 02:03 MYT (most likely around the same time secondary radar ceased to detect the aircraft), the SDU remained operative. After last contact by primary radar west of Malaysia, the following events were recorded in the log of Inmarsat's ground station at Perth, Western Australia (all times are MYT/UTC+8): (Note: Information released and reported publicly about SATCOM transmissions from Flight 370 have been inconsistent, especially the use of the terms "ping" and "handshake". It was initially reported as six "handshakes" or "pings" with one "partial handshake or ping" sent at 00:19 UTC by Flight 370, unprovoked by the ground station. The events listed may consist of several "transmissions" between the aircraft and ground station over the course of a few seconds. A readable copy of the ground station log of transmissions to and from Flight 370 is available online)

- 02:25:27 – First handshake ("log-on request" initiated by aircraft)
- 02:39:52 – Ground to aircraft telephone call, acknowledged by SDU, unanswered
- 03:41:00 – Second handshake (initiated by ground station)
- 04:41:02 – Third handshake (initiated by ground station)
- 05:41:24 – Fourth handshake (initiated by ground station)
- 06:41:19 – Fifth handshake (initiated by ground station)
- 07:13:58 – Ground to aircraft telephone call, acknowledged by SDU, unanswered
- 08:10:58 – Sixth handshake (initiated by ground station)
- 08:19:29 – Seventh handshake (initiated by aircraft); widely reported as a "partial handshake'", consisting of the following two transmissions:

- 08:19:29.416 – "log-on request" message transmitted by aircraft (seventh "partial" handshake)
- 08:19:37.443 – "log-on acknowledge" message transmitted by aircraft (last transmission received from Flight 370)

The aircraft did not respond to a ping at 09:15.

==== Inferences ====
A few inferences can be made from the satellite communications. The first is that the aircraft remained operational until at least 08:19 MYT—seven hours after final contact was made with air traffic control over the South China Sea. The varying burst frequency offset (BFO) values indicate the aircraft was moving at speed. The aircraft's SDU needs location and track information to keep its antenna pointed towards the satellite, so it can also be inferred that the aircraft's navigation system was operational.

Since the aircraft did not respond to a ping at 09:15, it can be concluded that at some point between 08:19 and 09:15, the aircraft lost the ability to communicate with the ground station. The log-on message sent from the aircraft at 08:19:29 was "log-on request"; there are only a few reasons the SDU would transmit this request, such as a power interruption, software failure, loss of critical systems providing input to the SDU, or a loss of the link due to the aircraft's attitude. Investigators consider the most likely reason to be that it was sent during power-up after an electrical outage.

The log-on request sent earlier in the flight at 02:25 also reveals that the satellite communication system was offline from some point after the final ACARS transmission at 01:06 until 02:25, possibly due to a power interruption. However, it is not known why the satellite system booted back up at 02:25 after being offline for some time.

At 08:19, the aircraft had been airborne for 7 hours and 38 minutes; the typical Kuala Lumpur-Beijing flight is 5 1/2 hours, so fuel exhaustion was likely. In the event of fuel exhaustion and engine flame-out, which would eliminate power to the SDU, the aircraft's ram air turbine (RAT) would deploy, providing power to some instruments and flight controls, including the SDU. Approximately 90 seconds after the 02:25 handshake—also a log-on request—communications from the aircraft's in-flight entertainment system were recorded in the ground station log. Similar messages would be expected following the 08:19 handshake, but none were received, supporting the fuel-exhaustion scenario.

==== Analysis ====
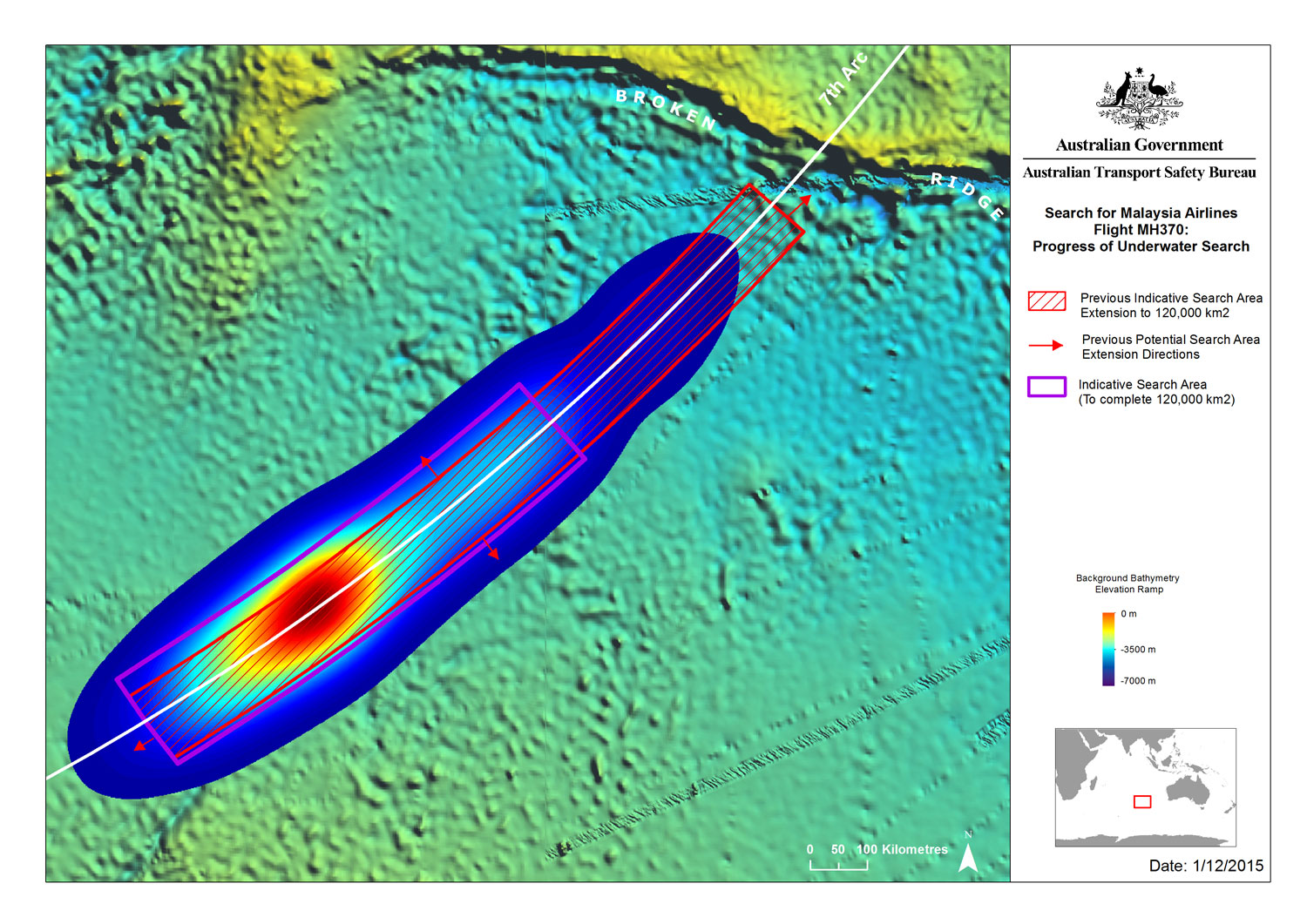
A heat map indicating the probable location of missing Flight 370 based on a Bayesian analysis of possible flight paths by Australia's Defence Science and Technology Group

Two parameters associated with these transmissions that were recorded in a log at the ground station were key to the investigation:

- Burst time offset (BTO) – the time difference between when a signal is sent from the ground station and when the response is received. This measure is proportional to twice the distance from the ground station via the satellite to the aircraft and includes the time that the SDU takes between receiving and responding to the message and time between reception and processing at the ground station. This measure was analysed to determine the distance between the satellite and the aircraft at the time each of the seven handshakes occurred, and thereby defining seven circles on the Earth's surface the points on whose circumference are equidistant from the satellite at the calculated distance. Those circles were then reduced to arcs by eliminating those parts of each circle that lay outside the aircraft's range.
- Burst frequency offset (BFO) – the difference between the expected and received frequency of transmissions. The difference is caused by: Doppler shifts as the signals travelled from the aircraft to the satellite to the ground station; the frequency translations made in the satellite and at the ground station; a small, constant error (bias) in the SDU that results from drift and ageing; and compensation applied by the SDU to counter the Doppler shift on the uplink. This measure was analysed to determine the aircraft's speed and heading, but multiple combinations of speed and heading can be valid solutions.

By combining the distance between the aircraft and satellite, speed, and heading with aircraft performance constraints (e.g. fuel consumption, possible speeds and altitudes), investigators generated candidate paths that were analysed separately by two methods. The first assumed the aircraft was flying on one of the three autopilot modes (two are further affected by whether the navigation system used magnetic north or true north as a reference), calculated the BTO and BFO values along these routes, and compared them with the values recorded from Flight 370. The second method generated paths which had the aircraft's speed and heading adjusted at the time of each handshake to minimise the difference between the calculated BFO of the path and the values recorded from Flight 370. A probability distribution for each method at the BTO arc of the sixth handshake of the two methods was created and then compared; 80% of the highest probability paths for both analyses combined intersect the BTO arc of the sixth handshake between 32.5°S and 38.1°S, which can be extrapolated to 33.5°S and 38.3°S along the BTO arc of the seventh handshake.

=== Analysis of hydrophone data ===
In May 2024, researchers at Cardiff University, writing in Scientific Reports, raised questions about the official location and the time of the impact. Usama Kadri stated that hydrophone data relating to MH370's crash identified "only a single, relatively weak signal" within the time frame and location of the official search, unlike the "clear pressure signals" shown in previous accidents' data with such impact. He also noted that "it is implausible to imagine that a significant crash of an aircraft on the ocean surface would fail to generate a discernible pressure signature," suggesting that controlled explosion experiments could "almost pinpoint" the aircraft's location, or possibly raise the need to reassess the time frame or location currently established.

== Speculated causes of disappearance ==
=== Murder–suicide by pilot ===
MH370’s presumed flight path is in yellow. Captain Shah's simulated flight is in red.

Malaysian police investigated the homes of the pilots and examined the financial records of all 12 crew members. According to the preliminary report released by Malaysia in March 2015, there was "no evidence of recent or imminent significant financial transactions carried out" by any pilot or crew member. Additionally, analysis of the pilots' behaviour on CCTV revealed "no significant behavioural changes."

Despite this, US officials consider it likely that someone in the cockpit of Flight 370 reprogrammed the aircraft's autopilot to head south over the Indian Ocean. Media reports have claimed that Malaysian police identified Captain Zaharie as the prime suspect, should human intervention be proven as the cause of the disappearance. In 2020, former Australian Prime Minister Tony Abbott stated in a Sky News documentary: "My very clear understanding, from the very top levels of the Malaysian government, is that from very, very early on, they thought it was murder–suicide by the pilot."

In 2023, retired engineers and pilots Jean-Luc Marchand and Patrick Blelly gave several conferences on the pilot suicide theory, supporting this argument with extensive analysis and a detailed report published online.

==== Pilot's flight simulator ====
In 2016, New York magazine wrote that a confidential document from the Malaysian police investigation showed an FBI analysis of the flight simulator's computer hard drive found a route on Captain Zaharie's copy of Microsoft Flight Simulator X that closely matched the projected flight over the Indian Ocean and that this evidence had been withheld from the publicly released investigative report. New York wrote as follows:

New York has obtained a confidential document from the Malaysian police investigation into the disappearance of Malaysia Airlines Flight 370 that shows that the plane's captain, Zaharie Ahmad Shah, conducted a simulated flight deep into the remote southern Indian Ocean less than a month before the plane vanished under uncannily similar circumstances. The revelation, which Malaysia withheld from a lengthy public report on the investigation, is the strongest evidence yet that Zaharie made off with the plane in a premeditated act of mass murder-suicide.

[...] The newly unveiled documents [...] suggest Malaysian officials have suppressed at least one key piece of incriminating information. This is not entirely surprising: There is a history in aircraft investigations of national safety boards refusing to believe that their pilots could have intentionally crashed an aircraft full of passengers.

The FBI's findings about the flight simulation were confirmed by the ATSB. News of the simulation was also confirmed by the Malaysian government, but reported as "nothing sinister".

==== Power interruption ====
The SATCOM link functioned normally from pre-flight (beginning at 00:00 MYT) until it responded to a ground-to-air ACARS message with an acknowledge message at 01:07. At some time between 01:07 and 02:03, power was lost to the Satellite Data Unit (SDU). The final report stated "it is likely that the loss of communication prior to the diversion is due to the systems being manually turned off or power interrupted to them." Malaysian Prime Minister Najib Razak said it was clear that the radar transponders and the flight data transmission system were turned off deliberately by someone trying to hide the aircraft's position and heading. At 02:25, the aircraft's SDU rebooted itself and sent a log-on request.

=== Passenger involvement ===
United States and Malaysian officials reviewed the backgrounds of every passenger named on the manifest. One passenger, who worked as a flight engineer for a Swiss jet charter company, was briefly under suspicion as a potential hijacker because he was thought to have the relevant "aviation skills".

Two men were found to have boarded Flight 370 with stolen passports, which raised suspicion in the immediate aftermath of its disappearance. The passports, one Austrian and one Italian, had been reported stolen in Thailand within the preceding two years. The two passengers were later identified as Iranian men, one aged 19 and the other 29, who had entered Malaysia on 28 February using valid Iranian passports. They were believed to be asylum seekers, and the Secretary General of Interpol later stated that the organisation was "inclined to conclude that it was not a terrorist incident".

=== Cargo ===
Flight 370 was carrying 10,806 kg (23,823 lb) of cargo, of which four unit load devices (standardized cargo containers) of mangosteens (a tropical fruit; total 4,566 kg or 10,066 lb) and 221 kg (487 lb) of lithium-ion batteries were of interest, according to Malaysian investigators. According to the head of Malaysian police, Khalid Abu Bakar, the people who handled the mangosteens and the Chinese importers were questioned in order to rule out sabotage.

The lithium-ion batteries were contained in a 2,453 kg (5,408 lb) consignment being shipped from Motorola Solutions facilities in Bayan Lepas, Malaysia, to Tianjin, China. They were packaged in accordance with IATA guidelines, but did not go through any additional inspections at Kuala Lumpur International Airport before being loaded onto Flight 370. Lithium-ion batteries can cause intense fires if they overheat and ignite, which has occurred on other flights, and has led to strict regulations on transport aircraft.

=== Unresponsive crew or hypoxia ===
An analysis by the ATSB comparing the evidence available for Flight 370 with three categories of accidents—an in-flight upset (e.g., stall), a glide event (e.g., engine failure, fuel exhaustion), and an unresponsive crew or hypoxia event—concluded that an unresponsive crew or hypoxia event "best fit the available evidence" for the five-hour period of the flight as it travelled south over the Indian Ocean without communication or significant deviations in its track, likely on autopilot. No consensus exists among investigators on the unresponsive crew or hypoxia theory. If no control inputs were made following flameout and the disengagement of autopilot, the aircraft would likely have entered a spiral dive and entered the ocean within 20 nmi (37 km; 23 mi) of the flameout and disengagement of autopilot.

The analysis of the flaperon showed that the landing flaps were not extended, supporting the spiral dive at high speed theory. In May 2018, the ATSB again asserted that the flight was not in control when it crashed, its spokesperson adding that "We have quite a bit of data to tell us that the aircraft, if it was being controlled at the end, it wasn't very successfully being controlled".

== Aftermath ==
=== Criticism of Malaysian authorities' management of information ===
Public communication from Malaysian officials regarding the loss of Flight 370 was initially beset with confusion. (Note: Examples: * Malaysia Airlines' chief executive, Ahmad Jauhari Yahya, initially said air traffic control was in contact with the aircraft two hours into the flight, when in fact the last contact with air traffic control was less than an hour after takeoff. * Malaysian authorities initially reported that four passengers used stolen passports to board the aircraft before settling on two: one Italian and one Austrian. * Malaysia abruptly widened the search area to the west on 9 March, and only later explained that military radar had detected the aircraft turning back. This was later formally denied by Rodzali Daud. * Malaysian authorities visited the homes of pilot Zaharie and co-pilot Fariq on 15 March, during which they took away a flight simulator belonging to Zaharie. Malaysian police chief Khalid Abu Bakar said this was the first police visit to those homes. On 17 March, the government contradicted this by saying police first visited the pilots' homes on the day following the flight's disappearance, although this had been previously denied. * On 16 March, Malaysia's acting transport minister contradicted the prime minister's account on the timing of the final data and communications received. Najib Razak had said that the ACARS system was switched off at 01:07. On 17 March, Malaysian officials said that the system was switched off sometime between 01:07, time of the last ACARS transmission, and 01:37, time of the next expected transmission. * Three days after saying that the aircraft was not transporting anything hazardous, Malaysia Airlines' chief executive Ahmad said that potentially dangerous lithium batteries were on board. * MAS chief executive initially claimed that the last voice communication from the aircraft was, "all right, good night", with the lack of a call sign fuelling speculation that the flight may have been hijacked. Three weeks later Malaysian authorities published the transcript that indicated the last words were "Good night Malaysian three seven zero".) The Malaysian government and the airline released imprecise, incomplete, and occasionally inaccurate information, with civilian officials sometimes contradicting military leaders. Malaysian officials were criticised for such persistent release of contradictory information, most notably regarding the last location and time of contact with the aircraft.

Malaysia's acting Transport Minister Hishammuddin Hussein, who was also the country's Defence Minister (until May 2018), denied the existence of problems between the participating countries, but academics explained that because of regional conflicts, there were genuine trust issues involved in co-operation and sharing intelligence, and that these were hampering the search. International relations experts suggested that entrenched rivalries over sovereignty, security, intelligence, and national interests made meaningful multilateral co-operation very difficult. A Chinese academic made the observation that the parties were searching independently, and it was therefore not a multilateral search effort. The Guardian newspaper noted the Vietnamese permission given for Chinese aircraft to overfly its airspace as a positive sign of co-operation. Vietnam temporarily scaled back its search operations after the country's Deputy Transport Minister cited a lack of communication from Malaysian officials despite requests for more information. China, through the official Xinhua News Agency, urged the Malaysian government to take charge and conduct the operation with greater transparency, a point echoed by the Chinese Foreign Ministry days later.

Malaysia had initially declined to release raw data from its military radar, deeming the information "too sensitive", but later acceded. Defence experts suggested that giving others access to radar information could be sensitive on a military level, for example: "The rate at which they can take the picture can also reveal how good the radar system is." One suggested that some countries could already have had radar data on the aircraft, but were reluctant to share any information that could potentially reveal their defence capabilities and compromise their own security. Similarly, submarines patrolling the South China Sea might have information in the event of a water impact, and sharing such information could reveal their locations and listening capabilities.

Criticism was also levelled at the delay of the search efforts. On 11 March 2014, three days after the aircraft disappeared, British satellite company Inmarsat (or its partner, SITA) had provided officials with data suggesting that the aircraft was nowhere near the areas in the Gulf of Thailand and the South China Sea being searched at the time, and that it may have diverted its course through a southern or northern corridor. This information was not acknowledged publicly until it was released by the Malaysian Prime Minister in a press conference on 15 March. Explaining why information about satellite signals had not been made available earlier, Malaysia Airlines stated that the raw satellite signals needed to be verified and analysed "so that their significance could be properly understood" before it could publicly confirm their existence. Acting Transport Minister Hishammuddin claimed that Malaysian and US investigators had immediately discussed the Inmarsat data upon receipt on 12 March, and that they had agreed to send the data to the US for further processing on two separate occasions. Data analysis was completed on 14 March, by which time the AAIB had independently arrived at the same conclusion.

In June 2014, relatives of passengers on Flight 370 began a crowdfunding campaign on Indiegogo to raise US$100,000 (~$135,999 in 2025)—with an ultimate goal of raising US$5 million—as a reward to encourage anyone with knowledge of the location of Flight 370, or the cause of its disappearance, to reveal what they knew. The campaign, which ended on 8 August 2014, raised US$100,516 from 1,007 contributors.

=== Malaysia Airlines ===
A month after the disappearance, Malaysia Airlines' chief executive Ahmad Jauhari Yahya acknowledged that ticket sales had declined but failed to provide specific details. This may have partially resulted from the suspension of the airline's advertising campaigns following the disappearance. Ahmad stated in an interview with The Wall Street Journal that the airline's "primary focus...is that we do take care of the families in terms of their emotional needs and also their financial needs. It is important that we provide answers for them. It is important that the world has answers, as well." In further remarks, Ahmad said he was not sure when the airline could start repairing its image, but that the airline was adequately insured to cover the financial loss stemming from Flight 370's disappearance. In China, where the majority of passengers were from, bookings on Malaysia Airlines were down 60% in March.

Malaysia Airlines retired the MH370 flight number and replaced it with MH318 (Flight 318) beginning 14 March 2014. This follows a common practice among airlines to redesignate flights after notorious accidents. As of September 2025, Malaysia Airlines still operates the Kuala Lumpur–Beijing route as MH318, though the flight now lands into Beijing Daxing instead of Beijing Capital.

Malaysia Airlines was given US$110 million (~$147 million in 2025) from insurers in March 2014 to cover initial payments to passengers' families and the search effort. In May, remarks from lead reinsurer of the flight, Allianz, indicated the insured market loss on Flight 370, including the search, was about US$350 million.

In 2017, Malaysia Airlines announced that it was the first airline to sign up for a new service that would track its aircraft anywhere in the world using orbiting satellites.

==== Financial troubles ====
At the time of Flight 370's disappearance, Malaysia Airlines was struggling to cut costs to compete with a wave of new, low-cost carriers in the region. In the previous three years, Malaysia Airlines had booked losses of: RM1.17 billion (US$356 million) in 2013, RM433 million in 2012, and RM2.5 billion in 2011. Malaysia Airlines lost RM443.4 million (US$137.4 million) in the first quarter of 2014 (January–March). The second quarter—the first full quarter in the aftermath of Flight 370's disappearance—saw a loss of RM307.04 million (US$97.6 million), representing a 75% increase over losses from the second quarter of 2013. Industry analysts expected Malaysia Airlines to lose further market share and face a challenging environment to stand out from competitors while addressing its financial plight. The company's stock, down as much as 20% following the disappearance of Flight 370, had fallen 80% over the previous five years, in contrast to a rise in the Malaysian stock market of about 80% over the same period.

Many analysts and the media suggested that Malaysia Airlines would need to rebrand and repair its image and require government assistance to return to profitability. The loss of Flight 17 in July greatly exacerbated Malaysia Airline's financial problems. The combined effect on consumer confidence of the loss of Flight 370 and Flight 17, and the airline's poor financial performance, led Khazanah Nasional—the majority shareholder (69.37%) and a Malaysian state-run investment arm—to announce on 8 August its plan to purchase the remainder of the airline, thereby renationalising it. Malaysia Airlines renationalised on 1 September 2015.

==== Compensation for passengers' next of kin ====
Lack of evidence in determining the cause of Flight 370's disappearance, as well as the absence of any physical confirmation that the aircraft crashed, raises many issues regarding responsibility for the accident and the payments made by insurance agencies. Under the Montreal Convention, it is the carrier's responsibility to prove lack of fault in an accident and each passenger's next of kin are automatically entitled, regardless of fault, to a payment of approximately US$175,000 (Note: The exact amount of this compensation is 113,100 special drawing rights. Using the official exchange rates on 16 July 2014, this is worth approximately: RM557,000; ¥1,073,000; US$174,000; €129,000; or £102,000.) from the airline's insurance company—amounting to a total of almost US$40 million for the 227 passengers on board.

Malaysia Airlines was also vulnerable to civil action from passengers' families. Compensation awarded during civil cases (or settlements reached out of court) was likely to vary widely among passengers, based on the country where the proceedings were to take place. An American court could be expected to award upwards of US$8–10 million, while Chinese courts would be likely to award a small fraction of that amount. Despite the announcement that the flight ended in the southern Indian Ocean, it was not until 29 January 2015 that the Malaysian government officially declared Flight 370 an accident with no survivors, a move that would allow compensation claims to be made. The first civil case relating to the disappearance was filed in October 2014—even before Flight 370 had been declared an accident—on behalf of two Malaysian boys whose father was a passenger; (Note: In March 2014, a petition for discovery was filed in a US court by a law firm, not representing relatives of families, against Boeing and Malaysia Airlines. It sought to obtain the names of manufacturers of aircraft parts along with maintenance records. It was reported in the media as a lawsuit or that Malaysia Airlines was being sued.) they were claiming for negligence in failing to contact the aircraft soon after it was lost and for breach of contract for failing to bring the passenger to his destination. Additional civil proceedings against Malaysia Airlines were filed in China and Malaysia.

Soon after the disappearance of Flight 370, Malaysia Airlines offered ex gratia condolence payments to families of the passengers. In China, the families were offered ¥31,000 (approx. US$5,000) "comfort money", but some rejected the offer. It was also reported that Malaysian relatives received only $2,000. In June 2014, Malaysia's deputy Foreign Minister Hamzah Zainuddin said that families of seven passengers received $50,000 advance compensation from Malaysia Airlines, but that full payout would come after the aircraft was found, or officially declared lost (which later occurred in January 2015).

=== Malaysia ===
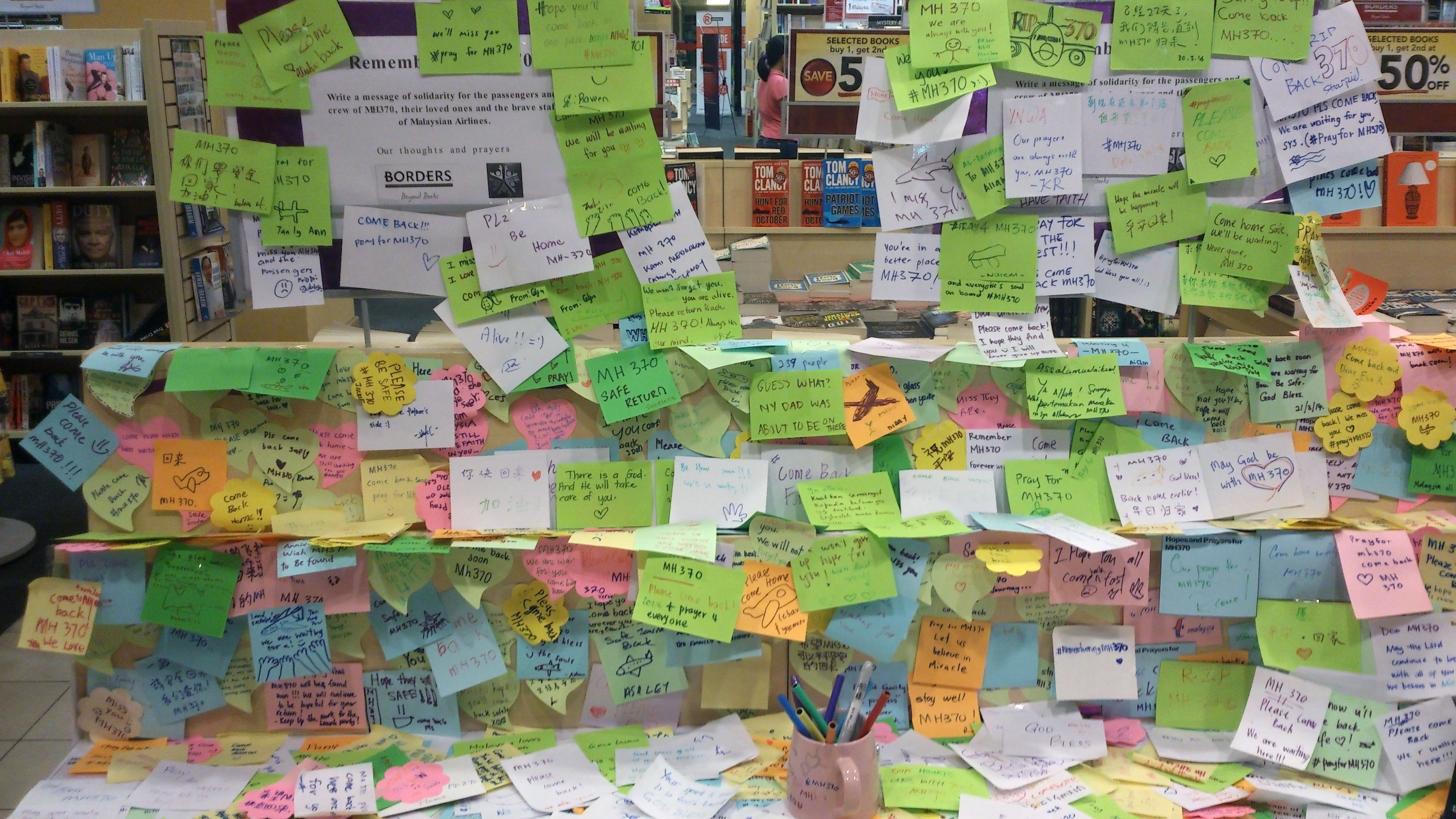
Messages for MH370 at a bookshop in Malaysia

==== Before 2016 ====
Many air force experts raised questions and the Malaysian opposition levelled criticisms about the state of Malaysia's air force and radar capabilities. Many criticised the failure of the Royal Malaysian Air Force to identify and respond to an unidentified aircraft (later determined to be Flight 370) flying through Malaysian airspace. The Malaysian military became aware of the unidentified aircraft only after reviewing radar recordings several hours after the flight's disappearance. The failure to recognise and react to the unidentified aircraft was a security breach, and was also a missed opportunity to intercept Flight 370 and prevent the time-consuming and expensive search operation.

The Malaysian Prime Minister, Najib Razak, responded to criticism of his government in an opinion piece published in The Wall Street Journal in which he acknowledged mistakes had been made, and said time would show that Malaysia had done its best, had helped co-ordinate the search, and would continue to provide support. Najib went on to emphasise the need for the aviation industry to "not only learn the lessons of MH370 but implement them," saying in closing that "the world learned from Air France Flight 447 but didn't act. The same mistake must not be made again."

Opposition leader Anwar Ibrahim criticised the Malaysian government regarding its response to Flight 370's disappearance and the military's response when Flight 370 turned back over the Malay Peninsula; he called for an international committee to take charge of the investigation "to save the image of the country and to save the country." Malaysian authorities have accused Anwar—who was jailed on contentious charges the day before Flight 370 disappeared—of politicising the crisis. Flight 370's captain was a supporter of Anwar, and the two men were acquainted.

Questioned about why Malaysia did not scramble fighter jets to intercept the aircraft as it tracked back across the Malay Peninsula, acting Transport Minister Hishammuddin noted that it was deemed a commercial aircraft and was not hostile, remarking: "If you're not going to shoot it down, what's the point of sending [a fighter jet] up?" According to former air force pilot major Ahmad Zaidi of RMAF Butterworth, no pilot stays on the base during the night, so the aircraft could not have been intercepted.

The response to the crisis and lack of transparency in the response brought attention to the state of media in Malaysia. After decades of tight media control, during which government officials were accustomed to passing over issues without scrutiny or accountability, Malaysia was suddenly thrust into the spotlight of the global media and unable to adjust to demands for transparency.

==== March 2020 ====
On 8 March 2020, six years after the disappearance, two memorial events were held to mark the anniversary. Families of MH370 passengers called for a new search for the flight in a bid to seek closure. Malaysia's former Transport Minister Anthony Loke had attended one of the events, expressing regret at being unable to table the compensation documents at the Cabinet level as per his original intent. The families hoped that the new Transport Minister Wee Ka Siong could expedite the compensation matters.

Malaysia's transport ministry secretary-general, Datuk Isham Ishak, stated that he had already submitted a request to meet the Prime Minister (Muhyiddin Yassin) the following week of 15 to 22 March so that he could present the paper on compensation for the families of MH370 victims, and that the ministry would also continue to seek support from the new government to resume the search for the missing aircraft.

=== China ===
Chinese Deputy Foreign Minister Xie Hangsheng reacted sceptically to the conclusion by the Malaysian government that the aircraft had gone down with no survivors, demanding on 24 March 2014 "all the relevant information and evidence about the satellite data analysis", and said that the Malaysian government must "finish all the work including search and rescue." The following day, Chinese president Xi Jinping sent a special envoy to Kuala Lumpur to consult with the Malaysian government over the missing aircraft.

==== Relatives of passengers ====
Based on a 2007 agreement with Malaysia Airlines, Tzu Chi, an international Buddhist organisation, sent specially trained teams to Beijing and Malaysia following the disappearance of MH370 in 2014 to give emotional assistance to passengers' families. The airline also sent its own team of caregivers and volunteers and agreed to bear the expense of bringing family members of the passengers to Kuala Lumpur and providing them with accommodation, medical care, and counselling. Altogether, 115 family members of the Chinese passengers flew to Kuala Lumpur. Some other family members chose to remain in China, fearing they would feel too isolated in Malaysia.

In the days following the disappearance of Flight 370, relatives of those on board became increasingly frustrated at the lack of news. On 25 March 2014, around two hundred family members of the Chinese passengers protested outside the Malaysian embassy in Beijing. Relatives who had arrived in Kuala Lumpur after the announcement continued with their protest, accusing Malaysia of hiding the truth and harbouring a murderer. They also wanted an apology from the Malaysian government for its poor initial handling of the disaster and its "premature" conclusion of total loss, drawn without any physical evidence. An op-ed in state media outlet China Daily said that Malaysia was not wholly to be blamed for its poor handling of such a "bizarre" and "unprecedented crisis," and appealed to the Chinese relatives not to allow emotions to prevail over evidence and rationality.

The Chinese ambassador to Malaysia defended the Malaysian government's response, stating that the "radical and irresponsible opinions [of the relatives] do not represent the views of Chinese people and the Chinese government". The ambassador also strongly criticised Western media for having "published false news, stoked conflict and even spread rumours" to the detriment of relatives and of Sino–Malaysian relations. On the other hand, a US Department of Defense official criticised China for what he perceived as providing apparently false leads that detracted from the search effort and wasted time and resources.

In July 2019, Beijing-based family members of some MH370 victims received notice from Malaysia Airlines that from July 2019 onwards, MAS would discontinue the "Meet the Families" discussion sessions in Beijing, China. This came after around 50 sessions had taken place.

==== Boycotts ====
Some Chinese citizens boycotted all things Malaysian, including holidays and singers, in protest of Malaysia's handling of the Flight 370 investigation. Bookings on Malaysia Airlines from China, where the majority of passengers were from, were down 60% in March. In late March, several major Chinese ticketing agencies—eLong, LY.com, Qunar, and Mango—discontinued the sale of airline tickets to Malaysia and several large Chinese travel agencies reported a 50% drop in tourists compared to the same period the year before. China was the third-largest source of visitors to Malaysia prior to Flight 370's disappearance, accounting for 1.79 million tourists in 2013. One market analyst predicted a 20–40% drop in Chinese tourists to Malaysia, resulting in a loss of 4–8 billion yuan (RM2.1–4.2 billion; US$0.65–1.3 billion).

The boycotts were largely led or supported by celebrities. Film star Chen Kun posted a message to Weibo—where he had 70 million followers—stating that he would be boycotting Malaysia until its government told the truth. The post was shared over 70,000 times and drew over 30,000 comments. More than 337,000 people retweeted a tweet from TV host Meng Fei which said that he would join the boycott.

China and Malaysia had previously nominated 2014 to be the "Malaysia–China Friendship Year" to celebrate 40 years of diplomatic relations between the two countries.

=== Air transport industry ===
The fact that a modern aircraft could disappear in a digitally connected world was met with surprise and disbelief by the public. While changes in the aviation industry often take years to be implemented, airlines and air transport authorities responded swiftly to take action on several measures to reduce the likelihood of a similar incident.

==== Aircraft tracking ====
The International Air Transport Association (IATA)—an industry trade organisation representing more than 240 airlines (accounting for 84% of global air traffic)—and the ICAO began working on implementing new measures to track aircraft in flight in real time. The IATA created a task force (which included several outside stakeholders) to define a minimal set of requirements that any tracking system must meet, allowing airlines to decide the best solution to track their aircraft. The IATA's task force planned to come up with several short-, medium-, and long-term solutions to ensure that information is provided in a timely manner to support search, rescue, and recovery activities in the wake of an aircraft accident. The task force was expected to provide a report to the ICAO on 30 September 2014, but announced on that date that the report would be delayed, citing the need for further clarification on some issues. In December 2014, the IATA task force recommended that, within 12 months, airlines track commercial aircraft in no longer than 15-minute intervals. The IATA itself did not support the deadline, which it believed could not be met by all airlines, but the proposed standard had the support of the ICAO. Although the ICAO can set standards, it has no legal authority, and such standards must be adopted by member states.

In 2016, the ICAO adopted a standard that, by November 2018, all aircraft over open ocean report their position every 15 minutes. In March, the ICAO approved an amendment to the Chicago Convention requiring new aircraft manufactured after 1 January 2021 to have autonomous tracking devices which could send location information at least once per minute in distress circumstances.

In May 2014, Inmarsat said that it would offer its tracking service for free to all aircraft equipped with an Inmarsat satellite connection (which includes the vast majority of commercial airliners). Inmarsat also changed the time period for handshakes with its terminals from one hour to 15 minutes.

==== Transponders ====
After the terrorist attacks of 11 September 2001, calls were made for transponders to become automated rather than manually operated; no changes were made because aviation experts preferred flexible control, in case of malfunctions or electrical emergencies. In the aftermath of Flight 370's disappearance, the air transport industry was still resistant to the installation of automated transponders, which would likely entail significant costs. Pilots also criticised changes of this kind, insisting on the need to cut power to equipment in the event of a fire. Nonetheless, new types of tamper-proof circuit breakers were being considered.

==== Flight recorders ====
Detection of the acoustic signal from the ULBs must be made below the thermocline and within a maximum range, under nominal conditions, of 2,000–3,000 m (6,600–9,800 ft). With a ULB battery life of 30–40 days, searching for the important flight recorders is very difficult without precise coordinates of the location at which the aircraft entered the water.

The intensive and urgent search for the flight recorders in early April 2014, due to the 30-day battery life of the underwater locator beacons (ULBs) (or "pingers") attached to them, drew attention to their inherent limitations. (Note: Regulations required ULBs to transmit a minimum of 30 days. The ULBs on the flight recorders on Flight 370 had a minimum 30-day battery life after immersion. The ULB manufacturer predicted the maximum battery life was 40 days after immersion.) The maximum distance from the ULBs at which the signal can be detected is normally 2,000–3,000 m (6,600–9,800 ft), or 4,500 m (14,800 ft) under favourable conditions. Even if the flight recorders are located, the cockpit voice recorder memory has the capacity to store only two hours of data, continuously recording over the oldest data. This storage capacity complies with regulations, which take account of the fact that it is usually only the data recordings from the last section of a flight that are needed to determine the cause of an accident. However, the events that led to Flight 370 diverting from its course, before disappearing, took place more than two hours before the flight ended. Given these shortcomings, and the importance of the data stored on flight recorders, Flight 370 has brought to attention new technologies that enable data streaming to the ground.

A call to increase the battery life of ULBs was made following the unsuccessful initial search in 2009 for the flight recorders on Air France Flight 447, which were not located until 2011. A formal recommendation that the ULB design be upgraded to offer a longer battery life, or to make the recorders ejectable, had been included in the final report of the board of inquiry into the loss of South African Airways Flight 295 over the Indian Ocean in 1987, but it was not until 2014 that the ICAO made such a recommendation, with implementation required by 2018. The European Aviation Safety Agency (EASA) issued new regulations that require the transmitting time of ULBs fitted to aircraft flight recorders to be increased from 30 to 90 days, to be implemented by 1 January 2020. The agency has also proposed that a new underwater locator beacon with a greater range of transmission should be fitted to aircraft that fly over oceans. In June 2015, Dukane, a manufacturer of underwater locator beacons, began selling beacons with a 90-day battery life.

In March 2016, the ICAO adopted several amendments to the Chicago Convention in order to address issues raised by the disappearance of Flight 370. These affected aircraft manufactured after 2020, requiring cockpit voice recorders to record at least 25 hours of data, to ensure that all phases of a flight are recorded. Aircraft designs approved after 2020 must incorporate a means of recovering the flight recorders, or the information contained on them, before the recorders sink below the water. This provision is performance-based so that it can be accomplished by different techniques, such as streaming flight recorder data from a stricken aircraft, or using flight recorders that eject from the aircraft and float on the surface of the water. The new regulations do not require modifications to be made to existing aircraft.

==== Safety recommendations ====
In January 2015, the U.S. National Transportation Safety Board cited Flight 370 and Air France Flight 447 when it issued eight safety recommendations related to locating aircraft wreckage in remote or underwater locations, and repeated recommendations for a crash-protected cockpit image recorder and tamper-resistant flight recorders and transponders.

=== Oceanographic research ===
The search for a crashed passenger aircraft in the remote southeast Indian Ocean led to significant scientific advances beyond its original aim. The region's isolation and limited prior exploration allowed the Australian institute to use the search effort to investigate a largely unknown area of deep seafloor. High-resolution shipborne sonar, or MBES mapping revealed that the seabed is far more complex than earlier satellite-based models suggested. Instead of a flat and uniform surface, the new data show a rugged landscape shaped by diverse geological processes.

The surveys identified numerous previously unrecognized features, including seamounts, submarine canyons, sedimentary structures, and underwater depressions. Evidence of seafloor spreading, rifting, active sediment transport, and fluid release was also observed, indicating an active geological history. These new discoveries have improved understanding of the geological evolution of the southeast Indian Ocean and highlight the deep ocean as a structurally diverse environment, suggesting increased potential for varied deep-sea habitats and biodiversity.

== In popular culture ==
The disappearance of Malaysia Airlines Flight 370 has been described as "one of the biggest mysteries in modern aviation history".

Several documentaries have been produced about the flight. The Smithsonian Channel aired a one-hour documentary on 6 April 2014, titled Malaysia 370: The Plane That Vanished, and the Discovery Channel broadcast a one-hour documentary about Flight 370 on 16 April 2014, titled Flight 370: The Missing Links.

On 17 June 2014, an episode of the television documentary series Horizon, titled "Where Is Flight MH370?" was broadcast on BBC Two. The programme documents how the aircraft disappeared, what experts believe to have happened to it, and how the search has unfolded. It also examines new technologies, such as flight recorder streaming and automatic dependent surveillance – broadcast (ADS-B), which may help prevent similar disappearances in the future. The programme concludes by noting that Ocean Shield had spent two months searching 850 km^{2} (330 mi^{2}) of ocean, but that it had searched far to the north of the Inmarsat "hotspot" on the final arc, at approximately 28 degrees south, where the aircraft was most likely to have crashed. On 8 October 2014, a modified version of the Horizon programme was broadcast in the U.S. by PBS as an episode of NOVA, titled "Why Planes Vanish".

The aviation disaster documentary television series Mayday (also known as Air Crash Investigation and Air Emergency) produced an episode on the disaster, titled "What Happened to Malaysian 370?". The episode aired in the UK on 8 March 2015, the first anniversary of Flight 370's disappearance. In August 2018, the television series Drain the Oceans, which airs on the National Geographic channel, highlighted the disaster, the methods used in the search, and the potential discoveries.

Panoply made a podcast story loosely based on the disappearance of MH370, called "Passenger List". Kelly Marie Tran played the lead character.

Jeff Rake, creator of the NBC show Manifest, said that after he had pitched his idea for the show without any success, the MH370 disappearance led to the TV network's sudden interest.

On the ninth anniversary of the aircraft's disappearance, 8 March 2023, a three-part docuseries, MH370: The Plane That Disappeared, premiered on Netflix.

In 2023, American comedian Jocelyn Chia was investigated by Malaysian police for breaching Malaysian laws relating to incitement and offensive online content, after making a joke about the flight at Comedy Cellar in New York City. Acryl Sani Abdullah Sani, chief of the Malaysian police, said an application would be filed to Interpol to find Chia's "full identity" and "latest location". A video of her stand-up performance was removed from TikTok for violating the platform's hate speech guidelines. The Singaporean ambassador to Malaysia stated that Chia (who grew up in Singapore) did not speak for Singaporeans. Vivian Balakrishnan, Singaporean Foreign Minister, called Chia's joke "horrendous statements". Chia stood by the joke, stating that it was being "taken out of context" and had been performed over 100 times without complaints before.

== See also ==
- List of accidents and incidents involving commercial aircraft
- List of aviation accidents and incidents in the 21st century
- List of missing aircraft
- List of people who disappeared mysteriously at sea
- List of unrecovered flight recorders
- List of unsolved deaths
