= DOF =

DOF may refer to:

== Science ==
- Depth of field, in photography a measurement of depth of acceptable sharpness in the object space, or subject space
- Depth-of-field adapter (often shortened to DOF adapter), used to achieve shallow depth of field on certain video cameras
- Depth of focus, in lens optics describes the tolerance of placement of the image plane to the lens
- Digital obstacle file, in aviation contains data on man-made obstacles
- 2,5-Dimethoxy-4-fluoroamphetamine, a psychedelic drug
- Distance-of-flight, a mass spectrometry technology
- Degrees of freedom, the number of parameters of a system that may vary independently
  - Degrees of freedom (mechanics)
  - Degrees of freedom (physics and chemistry)
  - Degrees of freedom (statistics)

== Music ==
- Deeds of Flesh, a death metal band
- Deutsch-Österreichisches Feingefühl or DÖF, a 1980s Austrian-German Neue Deutsche Welle pop band

== Organizations ==
- Dansk Ornitologisk Forening, Danish Ornithological Society
- Department of Finance (Philippines), an executive department in the Philippines
- Department of Finance (Northern Ireland), a government department in Northern Ireland
- DOF ASA, company
- DOF Subsea, company

== Other ==
- Diario Oficial de la Federación (Official Journal of the Federation), published by the Mexican government
- Double old fashioned glass, a glass for serving "lowball" cocktails that is typically 12-16 fluid ounces (350-470 ml)
- My Singing Monsters: Dawn of Fire, a prequel game in the My Singing Monsters series.
