= Bluefin =

Bluefin or Blue Fin and variants may refer to:

== Fish ==
- Bluefin tuna, multiple species of tuna
- Bluefin damsel (Neoglyphidodon melas), damselfish
- Bluefin driftfish (Psenes pellucidus)
- Bluefin gurnard (Chelidonichthys kumu), fish in the sea robin family
- Bluefin stoneroller (Campostoma pauciradii), fish in the family Cyprinidae
- Bluefin trevally (Caranx melampygus), marine fish in the jack family
- False bluefin trevally (Carangoides orthogrammus), fish in the jack family

== Other uses ==
- Blue Fin, a 1978 Australian family movie
- Bluefin Robotics, a maker of autonomous underwater vehicles
  - Bluefin-21, an underwater vehicle used in the Malaysia Airlines Flight 370 search
- Bluefin Labs, Massachusetts television analytics company
- New York Bluefins, a professional ice hockey team based in New York in the Federal Hockey League (2010–2013)
- MV Blue Fin, a cargo ship built in 1945 and sunk in 1965
- Project Bluefin, a Linux system created by Universal Blue, designed for reliability, performance, and sustainability.
