= Mission Center =

Linux system monitoring program

- Release: April 2, 2025; 19 months ago
- Stable release: 1.2.0 / July 24, 2026; 3 months ago
- Written in: Rust
- Operating system: Linux
- Available in: 38 languages
- Type: System monitoring program
- License: GPL-3.0-or-later
- Website: missioncenter.io
- Repository: gitlab.com/mission-center-devs/mission-center

Mission Center is a system monitoring program for Linux. It supports monitoring memory and CPU and GPU usage, along with I/O bandwidth of network and storage, and fan speeds.

Mission Center is written in Rust with the Libadwaita framework.

Mission center is included in Bazzite along with other Universal Blue operating systems like bluefin.
