= Knifefish (robot) =

Unmanned Underwater Vehicle (UUV) used by US Navy

Knifefish UUV
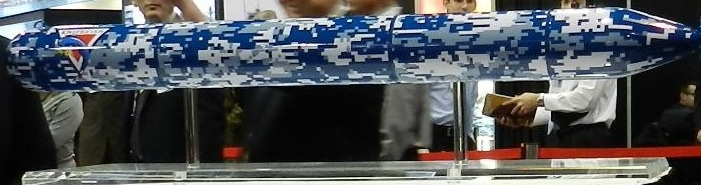
- 2012 demonstration model of the Knifefish UUV
- Manufacturer: General Dynamics Mission Systems; Bluefin Robotics
- Country: United States
- Year of creation: 2012 (initial unveiling)
- Type: Unmanned underwater vehicle
- Purpose: Minesweeping

The Knifefish is an autonomous unmanned underwater vehicle (UUV) under development by General Dynamics Mission Systems and Bluefin Robotics for the United States Navy. It is a propeller-driven minesweeping robot designed to replace the Navy's trained dolphins and sea lions after the retirement of the 50-year-old Marine Mammal Program in 2017. The Knifefish was first unveiled at a Navy exposition in April 2012, and was originally intended to operate in concert with the Navy's littoral combat ships (LCS) as part of a specialized counter-mine system. The Knifefish was used by the US in the 2026 Strait of Hormuz campaign.

== Design and operation ==
The robot is a derivative of the Bluefin-21, a civilian UUV designed by the Quincy, Massachusetts-based company Bluefin Robotics. In 2014, the Bluefin-21 gained widespread recognition after it was deployed to search the seafloor of the Indian Ocean for the wreckage of Malaysia Airlines Flight 370.

The Knifefish is a torpedo-shaped robot 22 feet (6.7 m) in length and 21 inches (0.53 m) in diameter, with an operational weight of 2,000 pounds (910 kg). It is powered by a lithium-ion battery, which allows it to operate for up to 16 hours on pre-programmed search missions. It uses onboard synthetic aperture sonar to detect floating or buried naval mines, and can identify a wide variety of mines and mine-like objects using an onboard database and analytical computer. The Knifefish can then mark detected mines and record their locations in its database; the robot later uploads the data to its parent LCS, which destroys the mines. The Knifefish may be modified to transmit its data in real-time, if the Navy considers such a capability necessary after the robot's sea trials. Each LCS will be capable of operating two Knifefish UUVs, which will scan the seabed near the ship and reduce the risk of mine damage to the LCS itself.

The Navy is considering increasing the endurance of the Knifefish to take over minehunting in addition to searching for buried and high-clutter mines. Due to reliability issues with the Remote Multimission Vehicle (RMMV), only 10 will be upgraded and fielded in 2018. The Navy is also pursuing adding a towed sonar to the Common Unmanned Surface Vehicle (CUSV) for fielding in 2020. For certain mine countermeasure missions, the Knifefish is superior to the RMMV, but it doesn't have the endurance to cover large minefields; if endurance can be enhanced, the MCM package would be simplified, as the sensor is embedded in the vehicle rather than towed, and the CUSV would only be used for minesweeping.

== Development ==
By December 2012, the Navy had ordered eight Knifefish units, at a total cost of US$20 million. In April 2013, General Dynamics completed its critical design review of the Knifefish, and began developing software and hardware for the operational version of the robot. The Knifefish was scheduled to begin sea trials in 2015, and to enter into active service in 2017, coinciding with the end of the Navy's Marine Mammal Program. Sea acceptance testings were completed off the coast of Massachusetts in 2018. On 20 July 2020, the U.S. Department of Defense awarded General Dynamics roughly $13.5 million for ongoing engineering on the Knifefish.

General Dynamics Mission Systems opened a new UUV manufacturing facility at its Taunton, Massachusetts, facility in August 2021. The UUV manufacturing and assembly centre of excellence is dedicated to the Knifefish and Bluefin Robotics UUV range.
