= First language =

Language a person is exposed to from birth

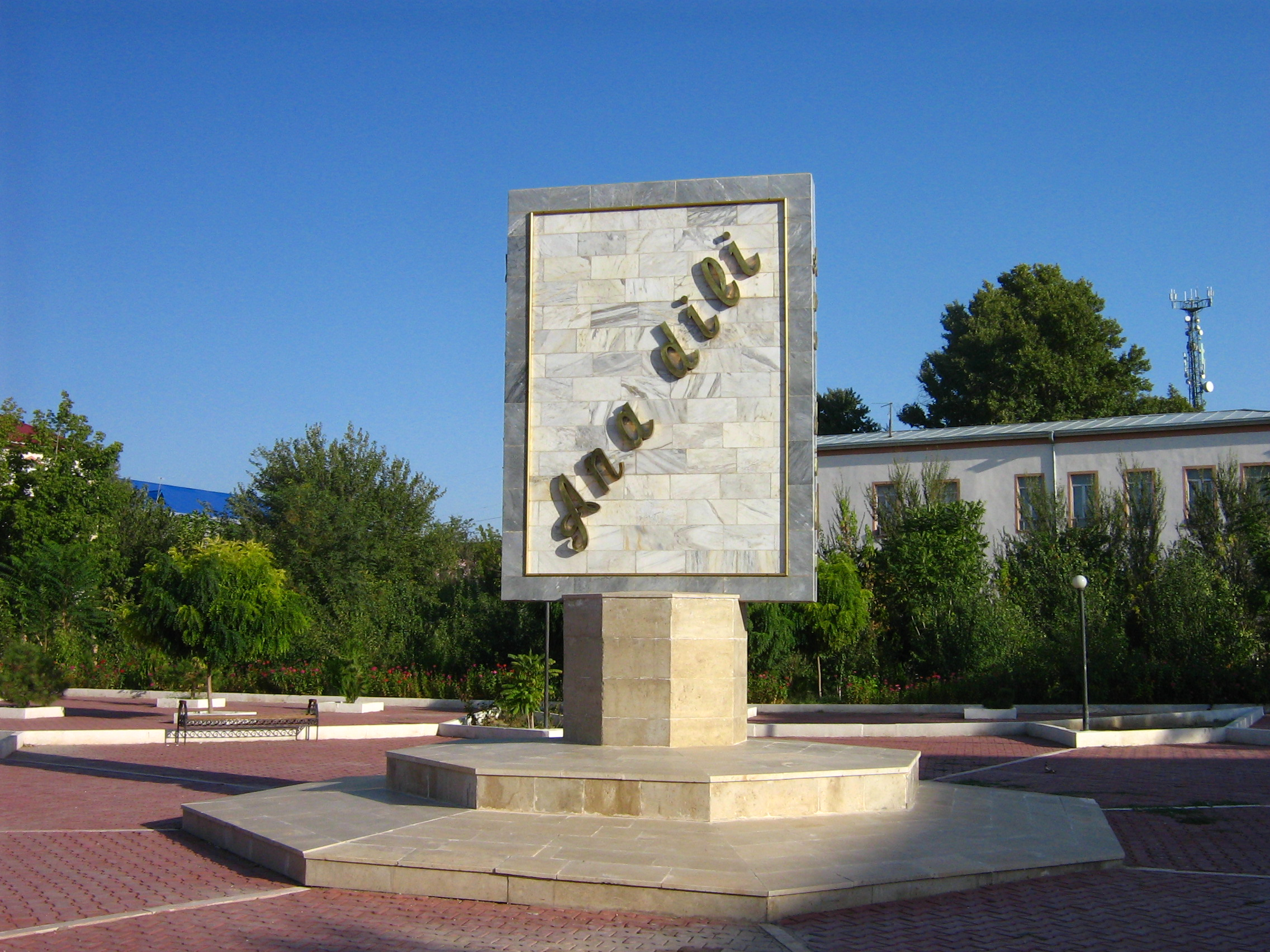
The monument to the mother tongue (ana dili) in Nakhchivan, Azerbaijan

A first language (L1), native language, native tongue, or mother tongue is the first language a person has been exposed to from birth or within the critical period. In some countries, the term native language or mother tongue refers to the language of one's ethnic group rather than the individual's actual first language. Generally, to state a language as a mother tongue, one must have full native fluency in that language.

The first language of a child is part of that child's personal, social and cultural identity. Another impact of the first language is that it brings about the reflection and learning of successful social patterns of acting and speaking. Research suggests that while a non-native speaker may develop fluency in a targeted language after about two years of immersion, it can take between five and seven years for that child to be at the same working level as their native speaking counterparts.

On 17 November 1999, UNESCO designated 21 February as International Mother Language Day.

== Definitions ==
A person qualifies as a "native speaker" of a language by being born and immersed in the language during youth, in a family in which the adults shared a similar language experience to the child. Native speakers are considered to be an authority on their given language because of their natural acquisition process regarding the language, as opposed to having learned the language later in life. That is achieved by personal interaction with the language and speakers of the language. Native speakers will not necessarily be knowledgeable about every grammatical rule of the language, but they will have good "intuition" of the rules through their experience with the language.

The designation "native language", in its general usage, is thought to be imprecise and subject to various interpretations that are biased linguistically, especially with respect to bilingual children from ethnic minority groups. Many scholars have given definitions of "native language" based on common usage, the emotional relation of the speaker towards the language, and even its dominance in relation to the environment. However, all three criteria lack precision. For many children whose home language differs from the language of the environment (the "official" language), it is debatable which language is their "native language".

=== Defining "native language" ===
- Based on origin: the language(s) or dialect one learned first (the language(s) or dialect in which one has established the first long-lasting verbal contacts).
- Based on internal identification: the language(s) one identifies with/as a speaker of;
- Based on external identification: the language(s) one is identified with/as a speaker of, by others.
- Based on competence: the language(s) one knows best.
- Based on function: the language(s) one uses most.
- Based on nationhood: the dominant language of an area and the language(s) used by the vast majority of the inhabitants. (see also regional language)

In some countries, such as Kenya, India, Belarus, Ukraine and various East Asian and Central Asian countries, "mother language" or "native language" is used to indicate the language of one's ethnic group in both common and journalistic parlance ("I have no apologies for not learning my mother tongue"), rather than one's first language. In Singapore, "mother tongue" refers to the language of one's ethnic group regardless of actual proficiency.

In the context of population censuses conducted on the Canadian population, Statistics Canada defines the mother tongue as "the first language learned at home in childhood and still understood by the individual at the time of the census." It is quite possible that the first language learned is no longer a speaker's dominant language. That includes young immigrant children whose families have moved to a new linguistic environment as well as people who learned their mother tongue as a young child at home (rather than the language of the majority of the community), who may have lost, in part or in totality, the language they first acquired (see language attrition). According to Ivan Illich, the term "mother tongue" was first used by Catholic monks to designate a particular language they used, instead of Latin, when they were "speaking from the pulpit". That is, the "holy mother the Church" introduced this term and colonies inherited it from Christianity as a part of colonialism. J. R. R. Tolkien, in his 1955 lecture "English and Welsh", distinguishes the "native tongue" from the "cradle tongue". The latter is the language one learns during early childhood, and one's true "native tongue" may be different, possibly determined by an inherited linguistic taste and may later in life be discovered by a strong emotional affinity to a specific dialect (Tolkien personally confessed to such an affinity to the Middle English of the West Midlands in particular).

Children brought up speaking more than one language can have more than one native language, and be bilingual or multilingual. By contrast, a second language is any language that one speaks other than one's first language.

== Bilingualism ==
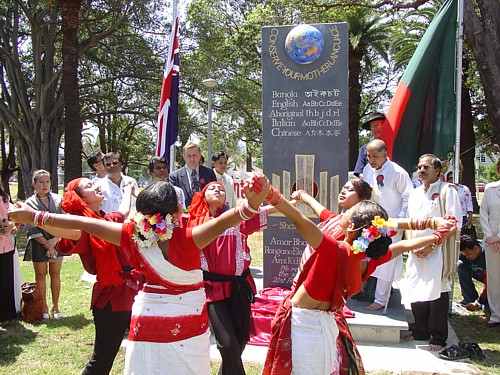
International Mother Language Day Monument in Sydney, Australia, unveiling ceremony, 21 February 2006

A related concept is bilingualism. One definition is that a person is bilingual if they are equally proficient in two languages. Someone who grows up speaking Spanish and then learns English for four years is bilingual only if they speak the two languages with equal fluency. Peal and Lambert were the first to test only "balanced" bilinguals—that is, a child who is completely fluent in two languages and feels that neither is their "native" language because they grasp both so perfectly. This study found that

- balanced bilinguals perform significantly better in tasks that require flexibility (they constantly shift between the two known languages depending on the situation),
- they are more aware of the arbitrary nature of language,
- they choose word associations based on logical rather than phonetic preferences.

== Multilingualism ==
One can have two or more native languages, thus being a native bilingual or indeed multilingual. The order in which these languages are learned is not necessarily the order of proficiency. For instance, if a French-speaking couple have a child who learned French first but then grew up in an English-speaking country, the child would likely be most proficient in English.

=== Defining "native speaker" ===
Defining what constitutes a native speaker is difficult, and there is no test which can identify one. It is not known whether native speakers are a defined group of people, or if the concept should be thought of as a perfect prototype to which actual speakers may or may not conform.

An article titled "The Native Speaker: An Achievable Model?" published by the Asian EFL Journal states that there are six general principles that relate to the definition of "native speaker". The principles, according to the study, are typically accepted by language experts across the scientific field. A native speaker is defined according to the following guidelines:

1. The individual acquired the language in early childhood and maintains the use of the language.
2. The individual has intuitive knowledge of the language.
3. The individual is able to produce fluent, spontaneous discourse.
4. The individual is communicatively competent in different social contexts.
5. The individual identifies with or is identified by a language community.
6. The individual does not have a foreign accent.

== See also ==
- Heritage language
- Child of deaf adult
- Human Speechome Project
- Third culture kid
- List of languages by number of native speakers
- Statistical learning in language acquisition
- Father tongue hypothesis
- Native tongue title
