= Ocean Shield =

Ocean Shield may refer to:

- ABFC Ocean Shield, an offshore support vessel acquired by the Royal Australian Navy in 2012, and transferred to Australian Customs in 2014
- Operation Ocean Shield, the NATO contribution to anti-piracy operations off the Horn of Africa from 2009 to 2016
- Operacija okeanski štit, the Russian naval exercise conducted off the coast of Syria in September 2018
