= Small extension node =

The small extension node (SEN) is part of a US military communication system known as Mobile Subscriber Equipment (MSE). A SEN is composed of two shelters, a switching shelter and a Line of sight radio terminal shelter(LOS).

== History ==
Prior to the advent of the satellite based Joint Network Node (JNN), the United States Army used a system known as Mobile Subscriber Equipment (MSE) in order to provide tactical battlefield communications. MSE is a Line-Of-Sight (LOS) terrestrial based communications system limited by terrain and distance. MSE is still in use in limited quantities. Developed as a direct replacement of the Multichannel communications telephone switching system used from the 1960 to early 2000s.

The MSE SEN primary role is to provide tactical telephone and data network communications to the battlefield. Capabilities include integration into existing and backwards compatible interfaces for older branch exchange, as well a field radio integration. This integration allows for the SEN capabilities to provide communications in battlefield as well as civilian communication disaster support.

== Description ==
A SEN switching shelter contains switching, multiplexing, and communications security (COMSEC) equipment for secure digital voice and data communications. A single switching shelter is mounted on the back of a HMMWV, powered is provided by a 10 kW diesel generator, and the SEN is operated by up to a six soldier team. To provide communications for a Corps area the Signal Battalion would deploy forty SEN's, amongst Node Centers, Large Extension Nodes, and Radio Access Units.

The current switch is designated AN/TTC-48, with a suffix to identify each of the ten versions in operation - (V)1, V(2), A(V)1, A(V)2, B(V)1, B(V)2, C(V)1, C(V)2, C(V)3, and C(V)4. The (V)1 provides 26 digital lines and 10-digital trunks and the (V)2 provides 41 digital lines and 13-digital trunks. Both versions interface at various levels with the MSE Area Communication Systems through cable, via line of sight or via tactical satellite terminal.
