= JNN =

JNN can refer to:

- Japan News Network AKA JNN
- Nanortalik Heliport (IATA airport code), in Nanortalik, Greenland
- Joint Network Node
