= Bluefin-21 =

Autonomous underwater vehicle

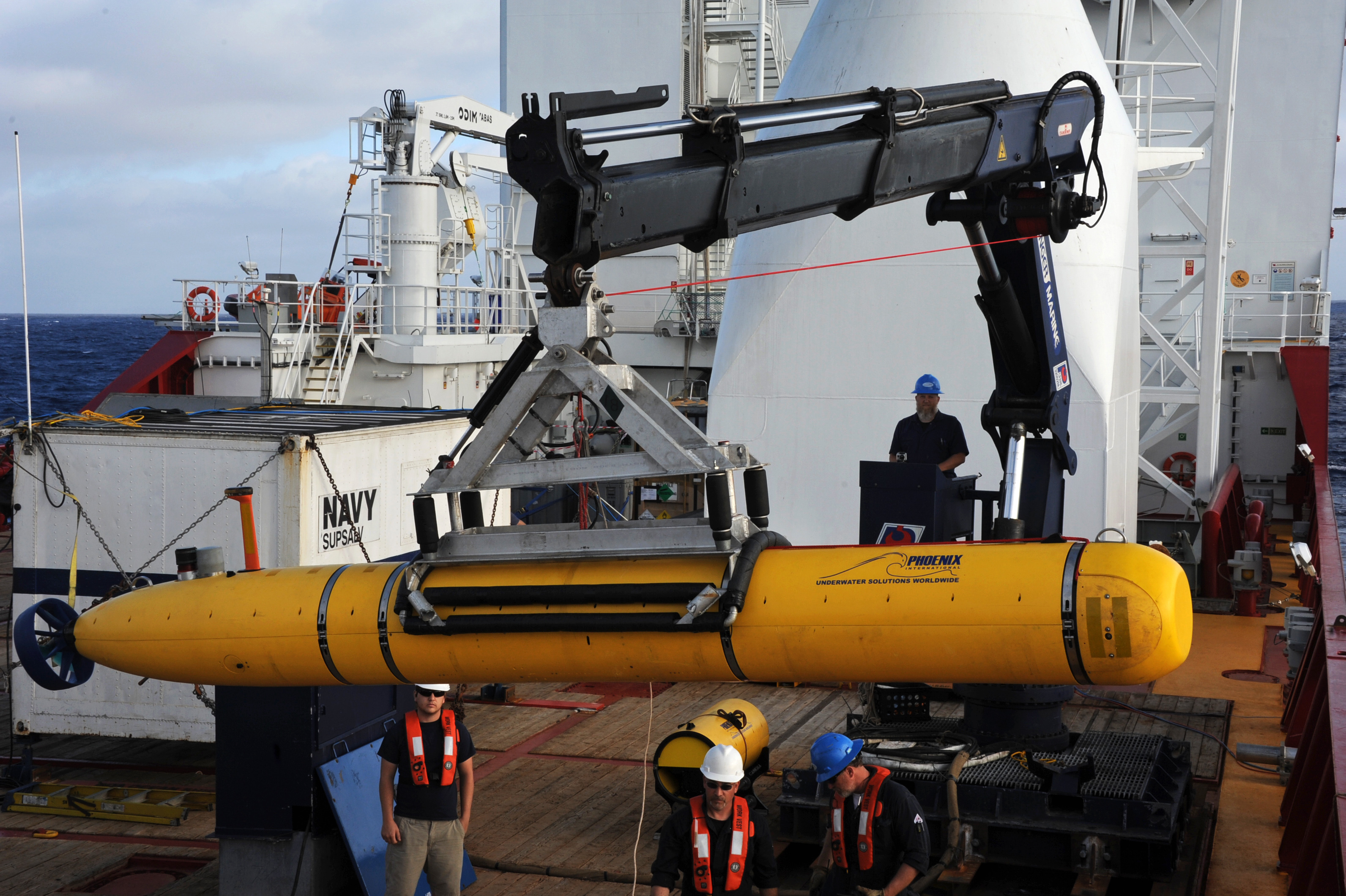
- Ocean Shield ready to deploy Bluefin-21 owned by Phoenix International during the search for MH 370, 14 April 2014
- Manufacturer: Bluefin Robotics
- Country: United States
- Type: Autonomous underwater vehicle
- Purpose: Deep-sea missions
- Website: http://www.bluefinrobotics.com/products/bluefin-21/

The Bluefin-21 is an autonomous underwater vehicle (AUV) developed by Bluefin Robotics for defence, commercial or scientific use. It found its most famous use in April 2014 in the search for the wreckage of the missing Malaysia Airlines Flight 370.

== Design ==
The Bluefin-21 is torpedo shaped and has interchangeable payload and battery components. This allows for the rapid deployment of the robot in time-bound missions. It has a modular design that can be adapted to carry a variety of sensors and payloads at one time, making it suitable for diverse deep-sea missions including offshore survey, marine salvage detection, marine archeology survey, oceanography, mine countermeasures, and the detection of unexploded ordnance. It is said to take two hours to descend to the bottom of the ocean and a further two hours to surface, with the ability to search for sixteen hours.

Bluefin-21 is powered by nine lithium-polymer batteries, each rated at 1.5 kilowatt-hours (5.4 MJ). This allows the robot to reach a top speed of 4.5 kn (8.3 km/h; 5.2 mph) and an endurance of 25 hours at 3 knots.

=== Payload and navigation ===
The typical payload of the Bluefin-21 consists of an EdgeTech 2200-M sonar, EdgeTech DW-216 sub-bottom profiler and Reson 7125 echoer. It can also be fitted with a Prosilica black and white camera. It has an onboard storage with a capacity of four gigabytes using a flash memory and can be fitted with additional storage space. Bluefin-21 uses an inertial navigation system for navigation. In addition it uses an ultrashort baseline system (USBL) for more accuracy.

== Notable uses ==
Artemis, a Bluefin-21 owned by Phoenix International, was used aboard ADV Ocean Shield in the search for the wreck of Malaysia Airlines Flight 370 by mapping the Zenith Plateau with a side-scan sonar, mapping 90 square kilometres a day. On its fifth mission, Artemis reached a depth of 4,695 metres (15,404 ft) after failing to find any wreckage in the previous attempts. It is believed to have cost 1 million USD for this mission alone. On 22 April, it was reported that Artemis was on its ninth mission. Artemis was used on 25 missions over 21 operational days, accumulating 370 hours of search time while covering 250 square miles.

== Specifications ==
The specifications of the Bluefin-21 are:

- Length: 4.93 m (16.2 ft)
- Diameter: 533 mm (21.0 in)
- Weight (dry): 750 kilograms (1,650 lb) (buoyancy weight 7.3 kilograms (16 lb)
- Maximum speed: 4.5 kn (8.3 km/h; 5.2 mph)
- Endurance: 25 hours at 3 knots
- Depth rating: 4,500 m (14,800 ft)
- Energy capacity: 9 × lithium polymer batteries each rated at 1.5 kWh (5.4 MJ)
- Total energy capacity: 13.5 kWh (49 MJ)

== See also ==
- Knifefish (robot), another autonomous underwater vehicle built by Bluefin Robotics
