= PM WIN-T =

Project Manager Warfighter Information Network-Tactical
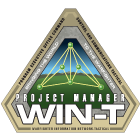
- Logo of PM WIN-T
- Country: United States
- Branch: Army
- Type: Tactical network
- Garrison/HQ: Aberdeen Proving Ground, MD

PM WIN-T (Project Manager Warfighter Information Network-Tactical) is a component of Program Executive Office Command, Control and Communications-Tactical in the United States Army. PM WIN-T has been absorbed into PM Tactical Networks as Product Manager for Mission Networks.

PM WIN-T designs, acquires, fields and supports tactical networks and services for US Army Soldiers, most notably the WIN-T suite of communication technologies.

== About ==
PM WIN-T provides the communications network (satellite and terrestrial) and services that allows the Warfighter to send and receive information in tactical situations. WIN-T is the transformational Command and Control system that manages tactical information transport at theatre through Company Echelons in support of full spectrum Army operations.

Besides WIN-T Increments 1, 2, and 3 (WIN-T), PM WIN-T is also responsible for the following systems, among others: the Area Common User System Modernization (ACUS MOD); Regional Hub Nodes (RHN); SIPR/NIPR Access Points (SNAP); Deployable Ku Band Earth Terminals (DKET); Secure, Mobile, Anti-Jam, Reliable, Tactical - Terminal (SMART-T); Phoenix/Super High Frequency (SHF); Global Broadcast Service (GBS), Standardized Integrated Command Post System (SICPS); and Harbormaster Command and Control Center (HCCC).

== WIN-T ==
=== History ===
In 1985 the Army embarked on the acquisition of the Mobile Subscriber Equipment (MSE) system, at an overall cost of more than US$4 billion (equivalent to $11.694 billion in 2024), to fill communications requirements from division down to the battalion level. MSE filled tactical telephone and switchboard requirements with a smaller, more mobile switching capability than had previously been used.

However, military operations in Desert Storm in 1991, as well as Operation Enduring Freedom in Afghanistan in 2001 and Operation Iraqi Freedom in 2003 revealed inadequacies in MSE to support highly mobile and dispersed forces in a digital environment. Before the widespread availability of satellite communications technology, battlefield communications required the installation and maintenance of relay towers and cables, limiting range and flexibility of missions. The outdated MSE could no longer keep up with the pace of battle. WIN-T was conceived to solve this problem and to enable mobile mission command on the battlefield. The systems development and integration for Project Manager WIN-T began in 2002.

Consequently, the Joint Network Node (JNN) network, as an outgrowth of the 3rd Infantry Division Operational Needs Statement, was developed to bridge the gap between MSE and the "full" on-the-move WIN-T network capability. The JNN network provided battalion-level and above with the ability to connect to the Army's digitized systems, voice, data and video via satellite Internet connection at-the-quick-halt. It obtained instantaneous battlefield success.

As a result, the Army, along with Congressional assistance in the form of supplemental funding, shifted their priority from WIN-T to JNN. The fielding of JNN started in 2004 to support operations in Iraq and Afghanistan. As the result of a Nunn-McCurdy restructure on June 5, 2007, the WIN-T program was restructured into four separate Increments. The JNN program was integrated into WIN-T as Increment 1. Further development led to Increment 2, which was first fielded in 2012. Funding re-allocation was debated by Congress in early June 2021.

=== WIN-T Increment 1 ===
WIN-T Increment 1 provides networking at-the-halt capability down to battalion level (1a) with a follow-on enhanced networking at-the-halt (1b) to improve efficiency and encryption. WIN-T Increment 1 components reside at the theater, corps, division, brigade and battalion levels.

WIN-T Increment 1 provides a full range of data, voice and video communications at-the-quick-halt, which allows soldiers to simply pull over on the side of the road to communicate without wasting valuable time setting up complicated infrastructure. WIN-T Increment 1 is a Joint compatible communications package that allows the Soldier to use advanced networking capabilities, and is also interoperable with current force systems and future increments of WIN-T. WIN-T Increment 1a upgrades the former Joint Network Node (JNN) satellite capability to access the Ka-band defense Wideband Global Satellite (WGS), reducing reliance on expensive commercial Ku-band satellite. WIN-T Increment 1b introduces the Net Centric Waveform (NCW), a dynamic waveform that optimizes bandwidth and satellite utilization and Colorless Core technology, which further enhances security.

Capabilities:

- Communications at-the-quick-halt
- Interoperable with all current and future WIN-T Increments
- Provides interface to legacy systems
- Encrypts classified traffic over Department of Defense (DoD) unclassified network
- Supports modularity by allowing a brigade combat team to have self-sustaining reach back communications
- Provides Internet infrastructure connectivity directly to the battalion level and above
- Allows independent deployment of command posts and centers constrained by line-of-sight radio ranges
- Connects the Soldier to the Global Information Grid /Defense Information Systems Network
- Transitions Army networks from proprietary protocols to Everything Over Internet Protocol
- Incorporates WIN-T Increment 2 technical insertions for improved capability

=== WIN-T Increment 2 ===
WIN-T Increment 2 provides networking on-the-move (OTM) capability through the addition of a secure networking package on existing Tactical Vehicles. This package employs military and commercial satellite connectivity and line-of-sight (terrestrial) radios and antennas to achieve end-to-end connectivity and dynamic ad hoc mobile networking operations. WIN-T Increment 2 extends the network to company level for maneuver brigades for the first time.

WIN-T Increment 2 increases mobility and provides a communication network down to the company level. Tactical Communication Nodes in Increment 2 are the first step to providing a mobile infrastructure on the battlefield. Combined with the Points of Presence (PoP), Vehicle Wireless Packages, and Soldier Network Extensions, Increment 2 enables mobile mission command from division to company in a completely ad hoc, self-forming, self-healing network. The WIN-T Increment 2 addition of embedding communications gear in select vehicles brings Secure Internet Protocol Router (SIPR) and CENTRIX (CXI) into the warfighting platform. Select staff have the ability to maneuver anywhere on the battlefield and maintain connectivity to the network.

WIN-T Increment 2 began fielding in October 2012 to the 4th Brigade Combat Team (4th BCT) of the 10th Mountain Division at Fort Polk, LA. The system made its combat debut in Afghanistan in July 2013 with the 2nd Battalion, 4th Infantry Regiment (4BCT/10MTN). In particular, the network PoP greatly enhanced the ability of 2-4IN to maintain network access, increasing situational awareness and threat warning while on the move and at the halt during multiple week-long, long range expeditionary advising operations with the Afghan National Army.

Capabilities:

- Increment 2 supports initial collaboration, mission planning and rehearsal, and for the first time introduces mobility to the network.
- Increment 2 brings a mobile network infrastructure, which means the network stays connected while moving.
- Increment 2 extends the network down to Company level.

=== WIN-T Increment 3 ===
WIN-T Increment 3 will provide the fully mobile, flexible, dynamic tactical networking capability needed to support a highly dispersed force over isolated areas. Building on previous increments, it will support full network planning and execution while on-the-move for maneuver, fires and aviation brigades. WIN-T Increment 3 also introduces the aerial tier to enhance reliability.

WIN-T Increment 3 provides full network mobility and introduces the air tier creating a three-tiered architecture: traditional line-of-sight (terrestrial), airborne through the use of Unmanned Aerial Systems and other airborne platforms; and beyond-line-of-sight (satellite). Additionally WIN-T Increment 3 introduces embedded Joint Command, Control, Communications, Computers, Intelligence, Surveillance (JC4ISR) radios into the platforms.

Capabilities:

- Enables the full objective WIN-T distribution of intelligence, surveillance and reconnaissance information via voice, data, and real time video
- Manages, prioritizes, and protects information through network operations (Network Management and Information Assurance)
- Ensures interoperability with joint, allied, coalition, current force, and commercial voice and data networks
- Uninterrupted flow of timely, relevant, and actionable information; the right information to the right Soldier, at the right time

== Other systems managed ==
=== Area Common User System Modernization (ACUS MOD) ===
ACUS MOD supports network upgrades for the Army's transformation to the current force, including secure wireless communications between Soldier's vehicles. It provides Internet network management capabilities, as well as integrated voice video and data services. It also allows for beyond-line-of-sight transmission capability, which enables Soldiers to communicate with one another from separate physical locations.

Capabilities

- Increased situational awareness to unit commanders
- Improved throughput and Joint interoperability
- Implements commercial-based technology insertions into the Current Force
- High Capacity Line of Sight (HCLOS) radio upgrades to Warfighter Information Network-Tactical (WIN-T) Increment 1 units
- Extends selected network capabilities to the battalion level
- Deployment orders to fire support radars
- Secure wireless connections both between and within tactical operations centers and command posts
- S6 functionality into a single vehicle shelter

=== Regional hub nodes ===
Regional hub nodes (RHN) serve as transport nodes for Warfighter Information Network-Tactical (WIN-T), the Army's tactical communications network backbone, as well as the transport medium for theater-based Network Service Centers, which are the basic building blocks for the Army's global network infrastructure. RHNs provide satellite, voice and data services to support forces as they flow into a theater of operations, including domestic disaster relief, and enable deployed units to connect to Department of Defense (DoD) networks.

RHNs innovatively use baseband and satellite communications capabilities that enable regionalized reach-back to the Army's global network. The RHNs operate "in sanctuary," or out of the fight zone, and were designed to provide division, brigade combat teams and below early access to the Global Information Grid, the infrastructure and services that move information through the global network. The RHN gives the Soldier in the field immediate access to secure and non-secure internet and voice communications, and it allows them to do their job anywhere on the globe. To provide tactical users with secure, reliable connectivity worldwide, the Army has positioned RHNs in five separate strategic regions: Continental United States (CONUS) East and CONUS West, Central Command, European Command, and Pacific Command.

Capabilities

- Currently used by both deployed Marine Corps and Army units
- By enabling forces to mobilize without having to develop their own transport and network access solutions, the cycle time for deployment decreases and Soldiers can focus on the assignment at hand.
- Reduces the amount of in-theater support required
- Promotes interoperability and a true global network infrastructure
- Serve as a gateway to quickly connect expeditionary forces and their tactical Information Technology systems into the enterprise network, giving them access to the network as soon as boots hit the ground

=== SIPR/NIPR access points ===
Certain locations in theater create unique satellite communication requirements that cause the need for SIPR/NIPR access points (SNAP) to be fielded to augment current Program of Record solutions. Project Manager Warfighter Information Network-Tactical (PM WIN-T) is bridging gaps in C4ISR created by rugged terrain and sparse infrastructure by deploying these transportable commercial-off-the-shelf Very Small Aperture Terminal (VSAT) satellite terminals that can deploy much more quickly than their traditional counterparts.

SNAP terminals provide reliable satellite communication access and take advantage of commercial equipment to expedite the fielding process. They provide access to the tactical and strategic networks for mission command, call for fire, Medevac and information exchange. SNAPs are a key communications component for units, providing secure beyond-line-of-sight communications at the company level and below. SNAPs are designed to provide satellite communications to small units at remote forward operating bases where they are unable to use terrestrial radios due to issues with terrain or distance.

Capabilities

- Work in concert with WIN-T Increments 1 and 2
- Weigh 1,200 - 1,300 pounds and fit into eight transit cases, which can be transported in the back of High Mobility Multipurpose Wheeled Vehicles or helicopters
- Modular design allows for varying dish and antenna sizes to appropriately satisfy mission requirements
- Easy to move around the battlefield, providing an expeditionary element to the force
- Certified Ka and X-band capability to take advantage of the Department of Defense's Wideband Global SATCOM satellites

=== Deployable Ku Band Earth Terminals ===
Deployable Ku Band Earth Terminals (DKET) are used at the higher level headquarters level, and their role is to transmit tactical communications information out of theater. Some of the DKETs take on dual roles to hub for smaller earth terminals and also to pass along other communication traffic. DKETs also are providing hub services for disadvantaged forward operating bases.

DKETs are satellite terminals designed for use at larger hub locations. They support commercial Ku-Band frequencies, and have recently been certified for Ka and X band capability to take advantage of U.S. military satellites. They are highly transportable, self-contained and can establish headquarters-level, network-hub connectivity anywhere a mission demands.

Capabilities

- DKETs are currently deployed in three configurations: Light (3.7 – 3.9M), Mobile (4.5M) and standard (4.6M – 7M), with the majority being the light design. This lighter design has a tri-fold antenna and a smaller shelter to make redeployment and setup faster and easier.
- The robust DKET network makes for a seamless transition to backup equipment or terminals, eliminates long outages and minimizes impact to the Soldier.
- DKETs operate on Ku, Ka and X-band frequencies.
- Electronics are housed in separate shelters

=== Secure, Mobile, Anti-Jam, Reliable, Tactical - Terminal (SMART-T) ===
Secure, Mobile, Anti-Jam, Reliable, Tactical - Terminal (SMART-T) provides tactical users with secure, survivable, anti-jam, satellite communications in a High Mobility Multi-Purpose Wheeled Vehicle (HMMWV) configuration using equipment to communicate at Extremely High Frequency (EHF) and processes data and voice communications at both low and medium EHF data rates. SMART-Ts are being modified to communicate over Advanced EHF (AEHF) satellite, which significantly increases data rates for future tactical communications networks.

The SMART-T makes it possible for Soldiers to extend the range of their network in such a manner that communications cannot be jammed, detected or intercepted. Soldiers at the brigade echelon and above can send text, data, voice and video communications beyond their area of operations without worrying that the information will fall into the hands of enemy forces.

Capabilities

- Interoperable with future AEHF satellite constellation
- Enhanced system interfaces
- Provides Low and Medium Data Rate (LDR/MDR) capability for voice and data transmission
- Interoperable with Milstar, UHF Follow-On, EHF MIL-STD 1582D and MIL-STD 188-136 compatible payloads
- Provides Anti-Jam and anti-scintillation (nuclear environment) communications
- Part of the WIN-T architecture and is compatible with both WIN-T Increments 1 and 2 and corresponding equipment

=== Phoenix/Super High Frequency (SHF) ===
Phoenix/Super High Frequency (SHF) provides multi-band capability in the SHF range that operates over commercial and military SHF satellites for Army expeditionary signal battalions and is the Soldier's primary means of reach-back communications.

Phoenix/SHF is a tactical satellite terminal that operates using various military and commercial frequencies and allows Soldiers to transmit and receive high bandwidth voice, video and data similar to shipboard communications. It is designed to operate 24 hours per day, seven days per week and provides assured and reliable communications throughout the world.

Capabilities

- Operates in military X and Ka Band and commercial C and Ku Bands with data rate up to 20 Mbit/s (50 Mbit/s with "D" terminal)
- Qualified for the military environment: temperature, shock, vibration
- High-capacity, inter- and intra-theater data range extension over commercial and military satellites
- Can interface with other strategic networks via Standardized Tactical Entry Points or strategic assets
- Provides highly mobile, strategically transportable, wideband communications capability and displaces selected AN/TSC-85/93 terminals at expeditionary signal battalions and complements the AN/TSC-85/93 Service Life Extension Program

=== Global Broadcast Service (GBS) ===
Global Broadcast Service (GBS) provides high-speed broadcast of large-volume information products such as video, imagery, maps and weather data to deployed Tactical Operations Centers and garrisoned forces worldwide. This wealth of critical information informs and educates the Soldier.

GBS provides high-speed, one way flow of multimegabit video and data products including National Television Standards Committee (NTSC) video, large data files, map files and web products. GBS operates as a system of broadcast sites with multiple receive suite types.

Capabilities

- Operates under the UHF Follow-On (UFO) Ka band satellites and the Wideband Global Satellite system, augmented as required by commercial Ku band satellites
- Transportable Ground Receive Suites allow deployed forces to directly receive national level data and full motion video and distribute to TOC local area network users
- Theater Injection Point provides the Combatant Command/ Combined Joint Force Command an in-theater uplink capability that broadcasts live UAV and other video feeds as well as data products generated in theater
- Transitioning to Joint IP Modem and moving Satellite Broadcast Manager to D Defense Information Services Agency's enterprise computing center sites

=== Standardized Integrated Command Post System (SICPS) ===
The Standardized Integrated Command Post System (SICPS) provides commanders with integrated Command Post capability including all supporting equipment and tools to enhance the mission command decision-making process across all phases of the operation. SICPS provides fully integrated, digitized, and interoperable Tactical Operations Centers for use by joint, interagency and multinational Soldiers and civilian crisis management teams. It includes legacy Command Posts (CP), Command Post Platforms, shelters, common shelters, and fixed CP facilities.

SICPS consists of the integration of approved and fielded mission command and other C4ISR systems technology into platforms supporting the operational needs of the current heavy, light, and Stryker Brigade Combat Team forces as well as requirements of the future force. SICPS consists of various systems, specifically the Command Post Platform, which includes the Command Post Local Area Network and Command Post Communications System; the Command Center System; and the Trailer Mounted Support System (TMSS).

Capabilities

- Standard, mobile, interoperable, and network centric
- Fully integrated mission command systems, communications equipment, local area networks (LAN), and intercom systems into a standard Army platform
- TMSS includes Army standard family of shelters, Environmental Control Unit and power generation
- Connectivity to tactical Internet
- Displays the Common Operational Picture (COP) to combined and Joint/coalition command and control nodes
- Integrates satellite communications and secure wireless LAN capabilities

=== Harbormaster Command and Control Center (HCCC) ===
Harbormaster Command and Control Center (HCCC) provides synchronization and control of Army watercraft distribution assets to ensure that water delivery of assets is precise, flexible and responsive to sustaining tailored forces operating in a dynamic environment. The HCCC program provides the US Army Harbormaster Detachments with a deployable mission command system that enables situational awareness and maintains real-time tracking of Army watercraft distribution assets and their cargos.

HCCC is a new deployable and tactically mobile system used to manage harbors, ports and beaches—the littoral environment—in Overseas Contingency Operations. It provides the Army logistician the sensors and knowledge management tools to establish and maintain situational awareness and mission command even in a chaotic shipping environment. HCCC allows logistics commanders to command and control within harbors, ports and shipping channels ensuring route security as Army logistics transitions from sea to shore.

Capabilities

- Battle Command - HCCC enables Commanders to maintain visibility, exercise authority and direction over Army Watercraft operations
- Situational Awareness - HCCC enables collaboration between logistics and maneuver forces and provides the ability to collect information on the local operational environment
- Stability Operations - HCCC enables Army Watercraft to collaborate with and support Joint, Coalition, and non-DoD mission partners
- Agile Sustainment - HCCC enables mobile, deployable, networked, multi-site mission command throughout the littoral operational environment

== Mission ==
Project Manager (PM) Warfighter Information Network-Tactical (WIN-T) designs, acquires, fields and supports fully integrated and cost effective tactical networks and services that meet Soldier capability needs while sustaining a world class workforce. PM WIN-T will incrementally develop and deliver products that simplify network initialization and management and significantly increase capabilities.

== See also ==
- List of established military terms
- Glossary of military abbreviations
