= Deb Roy =

Canadian computer scientist

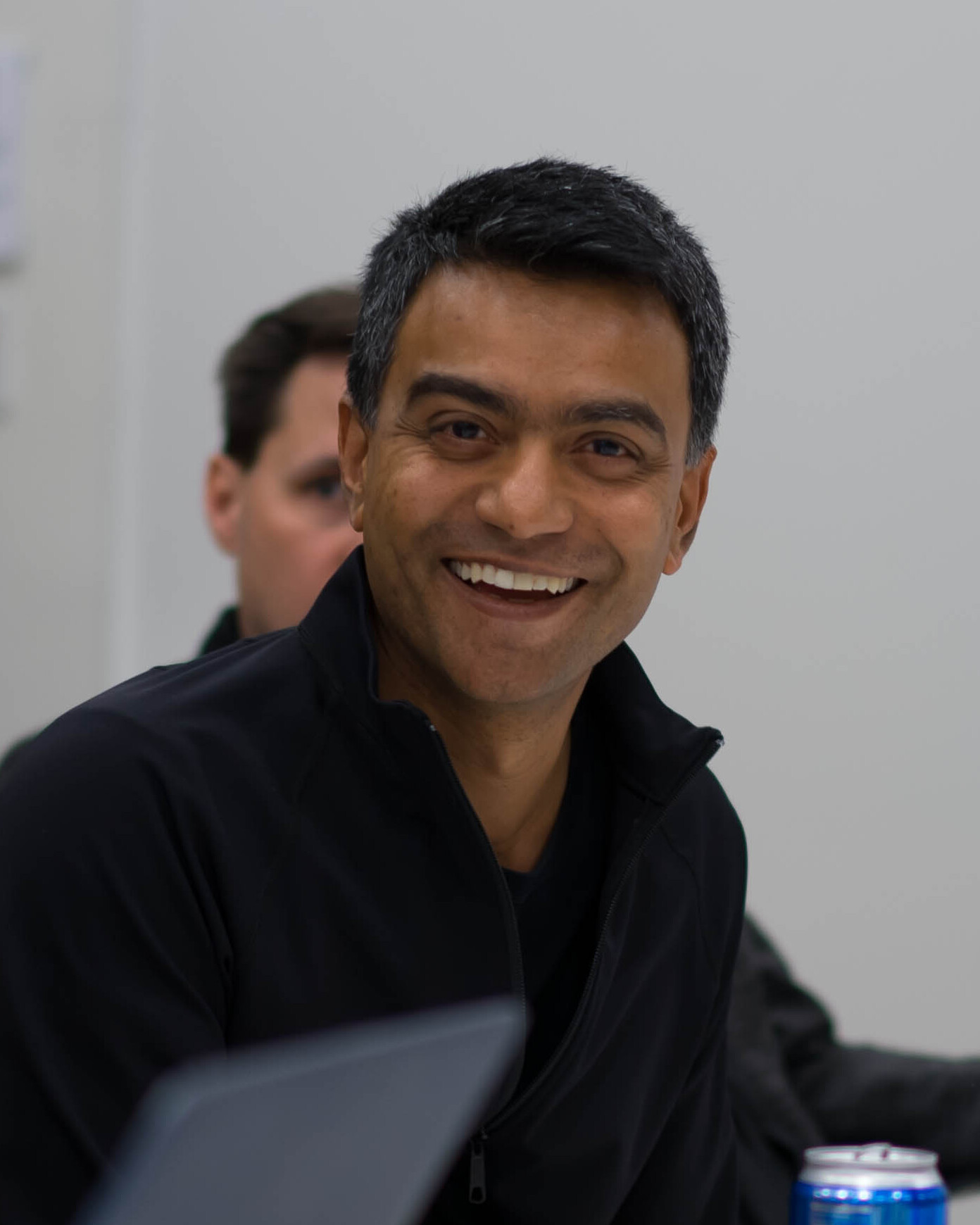
- Deb Roy at an MIT faculty meeting, 2014
- Born: Winnipeg, Manitoba, Canada
- Education: MIT; University of Waterloo
- Scientific career
- Workplaces: MIT, Bluefin Labs, Twitter
- Notable students: Bridgit Mendler

Deb Roy is a Canadian scientist, tenured professor at Massachusetts Institute of Technology (MIT), and the director of the MIT Center for Constructive Communication.

== Biography ==
Roy received a bachelor of applied science in computer engineering from the University of Waterloo, and a PhD in Media Arts and Sciences from MIT. He previously was the executive director of the MIT Media Lab and directed the Cognitive Machines group at the Media Lab, and the Laboratory for Social Machines.

Roy conducts research on language, games, and social dynamics at the intersection of artificial intelligence and cognitive psychology. An author of over 150 academic papers in machine learning, cognitive modeling, and human-machine interaction, his TED Talk, Birth of a Word (based on the 2006–2009 Human Speechome Project), has been viewed over 2.8 million times.

In 2008, he co-founded and was the founding CEO of Bluefin Labs, a social TV analytics company, which MIT Technology Review named as one of the 50 most innovative companies of 2012. Bluefin was acquired by Twitter in 2013, and Roy served as chief media scientist of Twitter from 2013 to 2017. He is also co-founder and chairman of Cortico, a nonprofit media technology company whose Local Voices Network aims to foster constructive public conversations across political and cultural divides.

The Laboratory for Social Machines started in 2014 with an investment of $10 million from Twitter over a five-year period. The agreement also gives the lab access to all historical Twitter data and access to the firehose of all real-time tweets. The lab aims to "create new platforms for both individuals and institutions to identify, discuss, and act on pressing societal problems."

In 2018, Soroush Vosoughi, Deb Roy, and Sinan Aral published "The spread of true and false news online" in Science. The paper examined "~126,000 stories tweeted by ~3 million people more than 4.5 million times," and found that "Falsehood diffused significantly farther, faster, deeper, and more broadly than the truth in all categories of information, and the effects were more pronounced for false political news than for false news about terrorism, natural disasters, science, urban legends, or financial information." Additionally, the authors found that "Contrary to conventional wisdom, robots accelerated the spread of true and false news at the same rate, implying that false news spreads more than the truth because humans, not robots, are more likely to spread it."

== See also ==
- Human Speechome Project
