= General Dynamics Mission Systems =

Aerospace and defense division

- Type: Division
- Industry: Defense and Aerospace
- Predecessor: General Dynamics C4 Systems and General Dynamics Advanced Information Systems
- Founded: 1999; 27 years ago
- Headquarters: Chantilly, Virginia, United States
- Area served: Global
- Key people: Chris Brady (president)
- Number of employees: 13,000+
- Parent: General Dynamics
- Website: https://gdmissionsystems.com

General Dynamics Mission Systems is a business unit of American defense and aerospace company General Dynamics. General Dynamics Mission Systems integrates secure communication and information systems and technology. General Dynamics Mission Systems has core manufacturing in secure communications networks; radios and satellite technology for the defense, cyber, public safety, and intelligence communities.

== History ==
General Dynamics Mission Systems was formed in January 2015 when General Dynamics combined the company's C4 Systems and Advanced Information Systems. General Dynamics C4 Systems was originally owned by GTE and operated as GTE Government Systems. General Dynamics acquired GTE Government Systems in 1999.

General Dynamics Advanced Information Systems provided mission-related systems development, integration and operations support. General Dynamics C4 Systems was a leading integrator of secure communications, information systems and technology.

General Dynamics SATCOM Technologies, a subsidiary of GDMS, was sold to CPI International in June 2020.

On May 22, 2024, the unit was sanctioned by the Chinese government due to arms sales to Taiwan.

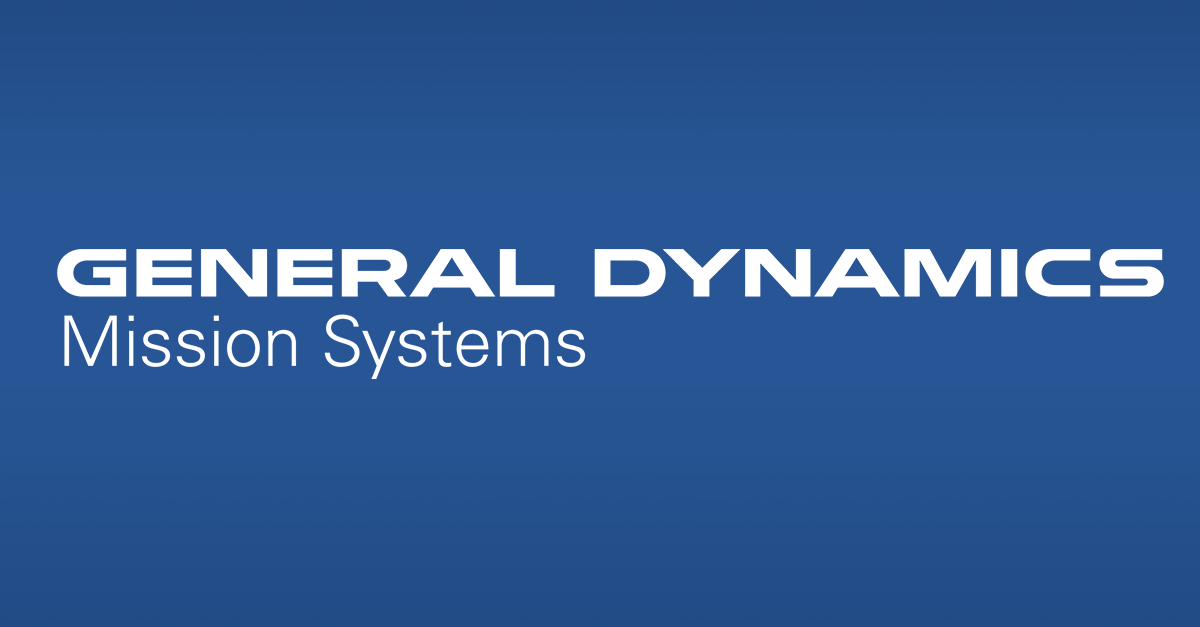
General Dynamics Mission Systems Logo

== Products and programs ==
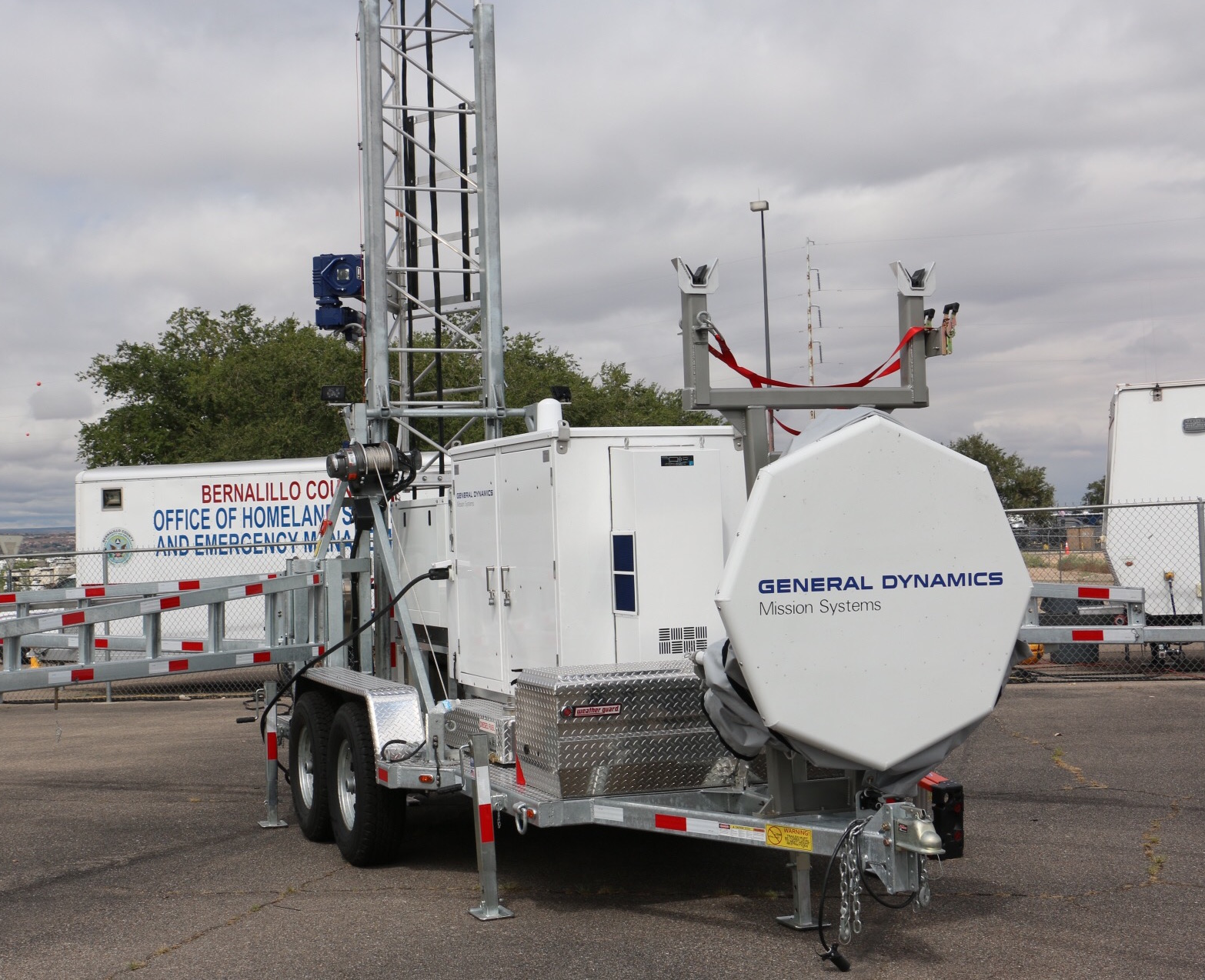
General Dynamics Mission Systems Deployable 4G LTE Cell on Wheels (COW) parked outside the New Mexico State Fair.

=== LTE ===
General Dynamics Mission Systems has the Cell on Wheels (COW), a deployable emergency LTE solution, that is used by first responders and other public safety officials. It is a mobile cell tower, able to cover about six square miles. This network was created in 2013.

Fortress LTE technology includes Virtual Core Network (vCN), eNodeB Base Stations, LTE Band 14 Outdoor Omni-Directional User Equipment, C-Band LTE User Equipment, LTE USB Stick Modem. 4G Evolved Node B (eNodeB) base stations are software defined radios that house both digital baseband and Radio Frequency (RF) circuits in a compact, rugged, mountable enclosure to eliminate external interfaces and reduce installation errors and setup time. A range of eNodeB form factors are offered for different deployment scenarios and support standard 4G LTE band classes and frequency ranges from 400 MHz to 6 GHz. Virtual Core Network (VCN) is virtual 4G core network that can be deployed on a wide range of COTS computing platforms. The VCN is an Evolved Packet Core (EPC) solution.

=== Cyber ===
Cyber Defense products include: TACLANE Network Encryptors, ProtecD@R Data-at-Rest Encryptors, GEM X™ Encryptor Manager, PitBull Operating System and Trusted Network Environment.

=== Maritime and Strategic Systems ===
General Dynamics Mission Systems acquired Bluefin Robotics in February 2016. They are a manufacturer of unmanned undersea vehicles (UUVs) that perform a wide range of missions for the U.S. military and commercial customers.

The Independence-variant Littoral combat ship (LCS) is built on General Dynamics Mission Systems open architecture computing infrastructure (OPEN CI). Austal has been contracted to build for the U.S. Navy as prime contractor subsequent to a $3.5 billion block buy in 2010.

In August 2016, the company successfully completed at-sea testing for its MATADOR Torpedo Detection System under the Build in Canada Innovation Program (BCIP). Tests were conducted on a Royal Canadian Navy Ship.

MATADOR is an acoustic processing system which detecting and tracking heavyweight anti-ship torpedoes.

=== Radio Communications ===
The CM-300/350 Series Version 2 radios are the latest additions to the Air Traffic Control (ATC) radios. Based on the FAA NEXCOM Segment 2 radio requirements, these rack mounted transmitter and receiver systems are specifically designed to meet the dynamic mission requirements of air traffic control centers, commercial airports, military air stations and range installations.

=== Radio Astronomy ===
The MeerKAT telescope array, a precursor telescope to South Africa’s planned Square Kilometer Array (SKA), comprises 64 radio antennas in South Africa’s Northern Cape Province. When completed in 2016, MeerKAT will be the largest most powerful radio telescope in the Southern Hemisphere until the SKA array is completed in 2024. MeerKAT covers eight kilometers and will facilitate research into cosmic magnetism, galactic evolution, and the large-scale structure of the cosmos, dark matter and the nature of transient radio sources among other science projects.

=== Space ===
General Dynamics Mission Systems provides the integrated ground segments for the Mobile User Objective System (MUOS) that is being used by the U.S. Navy, which will soon provide cell phone-like communications for warfighters on the move.

=== Intelligence Systems ===
TAC-MAAS is a motion imagery processing and exploitation system that is STANAG 4609 / NGA Motion Imagery Standard Profile (MISP) compliant. The international equivalent to this product is D-VEX that is sold by an Australian-based subsidiary, General Dynamics Mediaware.

=== WIN-T Program ===
WIN-T: Warfighter Information Network-Tactical (WIN-T) is the Army's tactical communications system. General Dynamics is the Army's prime contractor for WIN-T, which is part of General Dynamics Mission Systems' tactical voice and data communications systems, The Soldier's Network. Increment 1, now fully deployed, began fielding in 2004 and completed fielding in 2012. In November 2007, General Dynamics announced a $78 million order on an indefinite delivery and quantity contract for WIN-T Increment 1. In April 2015, General Dynamics Mission Systems was awarded a $36 million army contract for maintenance and repair of all products related to Increment 1. In June 2015, General Dynamics secured a contract for Increment 2, valued at $219 million. Increment 2 includes additional capabilities, such as mobile broadband. Increment 1 and 2 equipment will remain in the field at the battalion and company levels as Increment 3 is completed.

== Subsidiaries of GDMS ==
- General Dynamics Mission Systems - Canada, a subsidiary of GDMS
- General Dynamics UK
- General Dynamics Mediaware
- Progeny Systems, LLC
