= Air traffic obstacle =

Tall structure which can endanger air traffic

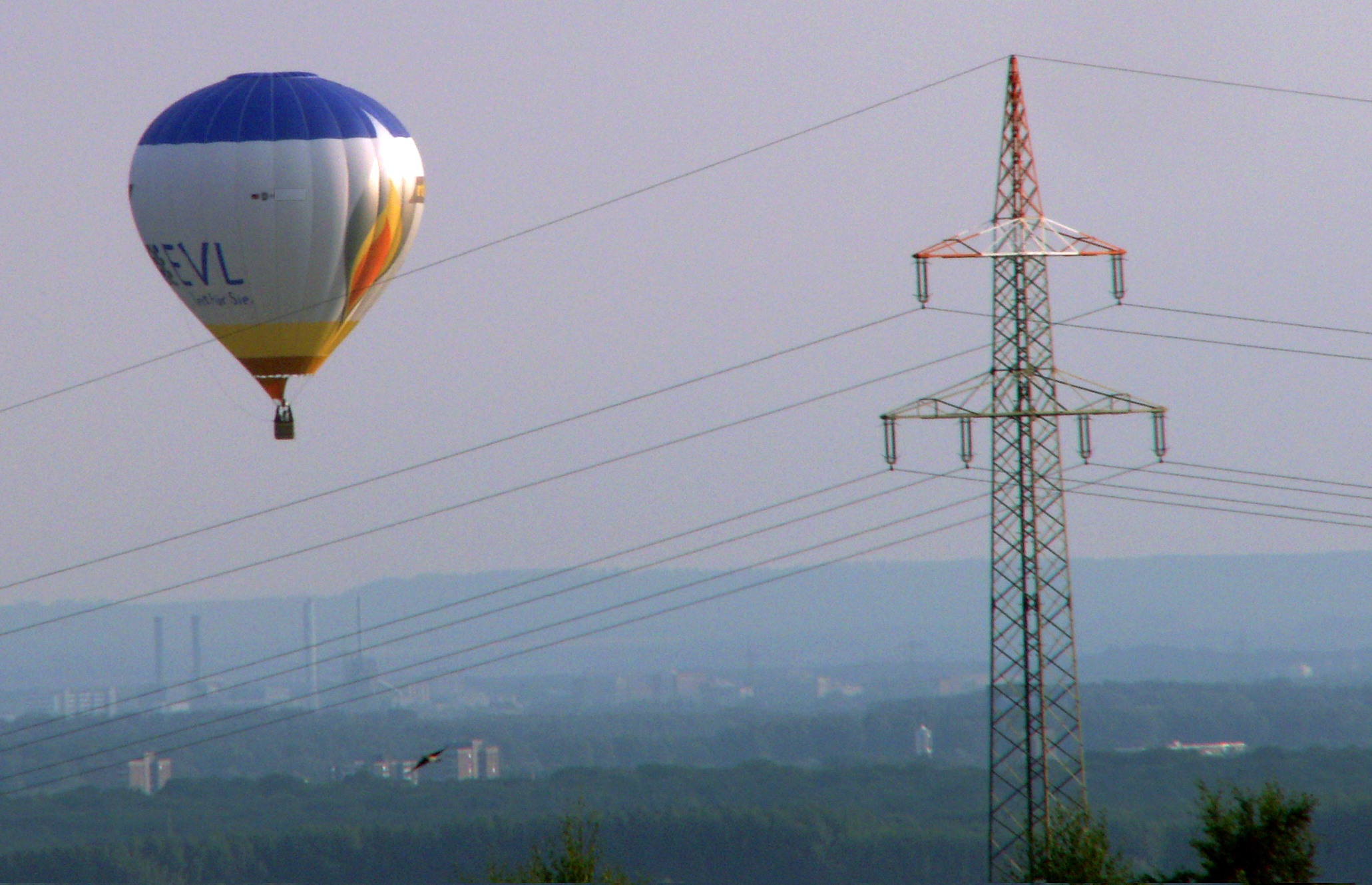
Dangerous proximity of a hot air balloon to an overhead line. Note the red and white painted tower.

An Air traffic obstacle is a tall structure which can endanger air traffic. Air traffic obstacles have to be marked in most cases with red and white colored markings and with aircraft warning lights at night. On larger structures blinking lights are required. An example of an air traffic obstacle is the air traffic control tower.

In the past lamps similar to those used on lighthouses were sometimes used. There are still such lamps on Fernsehturm Stuttgart in Stuttgart, Germany. A fainter rotating light is on Blosenbergturm, Beromünster, Switzerland.

A special method of marking was used at the mast of Deutschlandsender Herzberg/Elster in 1939. On small poles near the mast multiple rotating skybeamers were mounted which illuminated the lens-like structure on the top. Because of this no electrical installation was required on this mast.

== See also ==
- Air navigation
- Digital obstacle file
