= ABFC Ocean Shield =

Offshore patrol vessel operated by the Australian Border Force

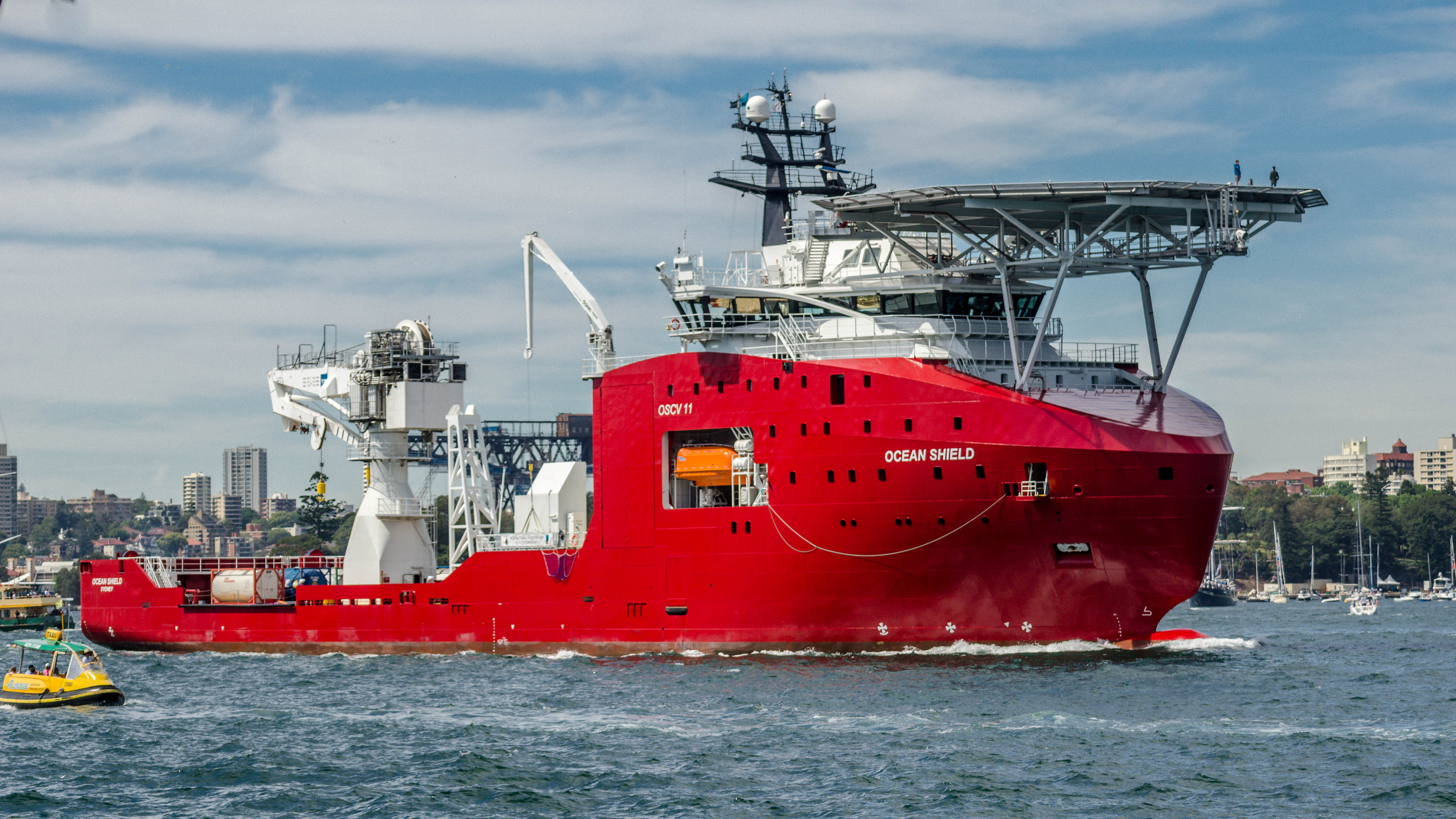
- Ocean Shield during International Fleet Review 2013

History

Australia
- Name: Ocean Shield
- Owner: Australian Border Force
- Operator: Australian Border Force
- Ordered: 10 December 2010
- Builder: STX OSV, Tulcea, Romania, Outfitting=STX OSV, Søvik, Norway,
- Yard number: 771
- Laid down: 11 April 2011
- Launched: 22 October 2011
- Completed: 22 May 2012
- Acquired: 19 March 2012
- In service: 30 June 2012
- Home port: Sydney, Australia
- Identification: MMSI number: 503728000; IMO number: 9628374; Call sign: VHEH
- Status: In service

History
- Name: 2010–2012: Skandi Bergen
- Owner: 2010–2012: DOF Subsea Rederi AS
- Operator: 2010–2012: DOF Management AS
- Home port: 2010–2012: Nassau, Bahamas

General characteristics
- Type: Offshore Subsea Construction and Maintenance Vessel
- Tonnage: 10,000 gross tons
- Displacement: 8,500 tonnes (full load)
- Length: 110.9 m (364 ft) length overall
- Beam: 22.05 m (72.3 ft)
- Draught: 6.6 m (22 ft)
- Depth: 9 m (30 ft)
- Ice class: DNV ICE-1B
- Installed power: 4 × Wärtsilä 6L32, 2,880-kilowatt (3,860 hp) each
- Propulsion: Diesel-electric; Two Rolls-Royce Contaz 35 azimuth thrusters (2 × 3,000 kW); Two bow thrusters (2 × 1,800 kW); One retractable azimuth thruster in bow (1,500 kW)1,500-kilowatt (2,000 hp) bow azimuth thruster
- Speed: 16 knots (30 km/h; 18 mph)
- Capacity: 120
- Crew: 22 + 50
- Armament: Unarmed (RAN); 2 x 12.7 mm machine guns (Customs)
- Aviation facilities: Helipad

Australian Border Force Cutter Ocean Shield (ABFC Ocean Shield) is an offshore patrol vessel operated by the Australian Border Force. The ship was originally ordered in 2010 by DOF Subsea as an offshore support vessel, and was laid down by STX OSV as MSV Skandi Bergen in 2011. In 2012, the Australian Department of Defence was seeking a short-term replacement for the decommissioned Kanimbla-class amphibious landing ships, and negotiated to purchase the under-construction Skandi Bergen from DOF Subsea. The ship was completed, and entered Royal Australian Navy (RAN) service in mid-2012 as the civilian-crewed Australian Defence Vessel (ADV) Ocean Shield.

Following the disappearance of Malaysia Airlines Flight 370, Ocean Shield was one of several Australian vessels to take part in the search.

Ocean Shield's operation was only intended to cover the shortfall in RAN sealift capability until the Canberra-class landing helicopter dock ships entered service, and in 2014, the vessel was handed over to the Australian Customs and Border Protection Service (the precursor agency to the Border Force), with the ship's designation changing to Australian Customs Vessel (ACV) Ocean Shield. The restructuring of Customs to create the Border Force occurred in mid-2015, with Ocean Shield's prefix changing from ACV to ABFC.

== Construction and acquisition ==
The offshore construction vessel was ordered on 10 December 2010 by DOF Subsea, from STX OSV. The ship, based on the STX OSCV 11 design and to be named Skandi Bergen, was laid down at STX OSV's shipyard in Tulcea, Romania on 11 April 2011 with yard number 771, and launched on 22 October 2011.

She has a displacement of 8,500 tonnes and a tonnage value of 8,368 gross tons, a length overall of 110.9 metres (364 ft), a beam of 22.05 metres (72.3 ft), a depth of 9 metres (30 ft), and a draught of 6.6 metres (22 ft). The propulsion system consists of two Rolls-Royce Contaz 35 3,000-kilowatt (4,000 hp) azimuth thrusters at the stern, two 1,800-kilowatt (2,400 hp) tunnel thrusters at the bow, plus a 1,500-kilowatt (2,000 hp), retractable azimuth thruster, also near the bow. Maximum speed is 16 knots (30 km/h; 18 mph). Power is generated by four Wärtsilä 6L32 2,880-kilowatt (3,860 hp) medium speed diesel generators. The ship has a complement of 22, plus accommodation for another 50 crew, and basic facilities to carry a further 120. A helipad suitable for up to medium-size helicopters is sited at the ship's bow, above the bridge. She also has 1,000 square metres (11,000 sq ft) of deck area for cargo and equipment.

On 19 March 2012, the Australian government announced the purchase of Skandi Bergen in a group of Defence acquisitions. The vessel was required to supplement the RAN's sealift capability of the RAN after the Kanimbla-class amphibious landing ships were decommissioned early due to ongoing mechanical issues. Intended operations included the transportation of equipment and personnel as part of humanitarian and disaster relief operations. The ship cost A$130 million: the price did not include the vessel's subsea equipment. This equipment was retained by the shipyard for installation in a replacement vessel ordered by DOF Subsea, with a 60-tonne SWL crane fitted instead to Skandi Bergen. Fitting out was completed on 22 May 2012, and on 3 June 2012, the ship's new name, Ocean Shield, was announced. Although operated as part of the RAN, Ocean Shield carried a civilian crew, and used the prefix ADV (Australian Defence Vessel), instead of being commissioned and receiving the HMAS prefix. Although unarmed in RAN service, after the transfer to Customs, the ship was fitted with two 12.7 mm machine guns.

== Operational history ==
Sea trials were overseen by Teekay Shipping. Ocean Shield arrived in Fremantle, Australia on 28 June 2012, and was accepted into naval service on 30 June.

In October 2013, the ship participated in the International Fleet Review 2013 in Sydney.

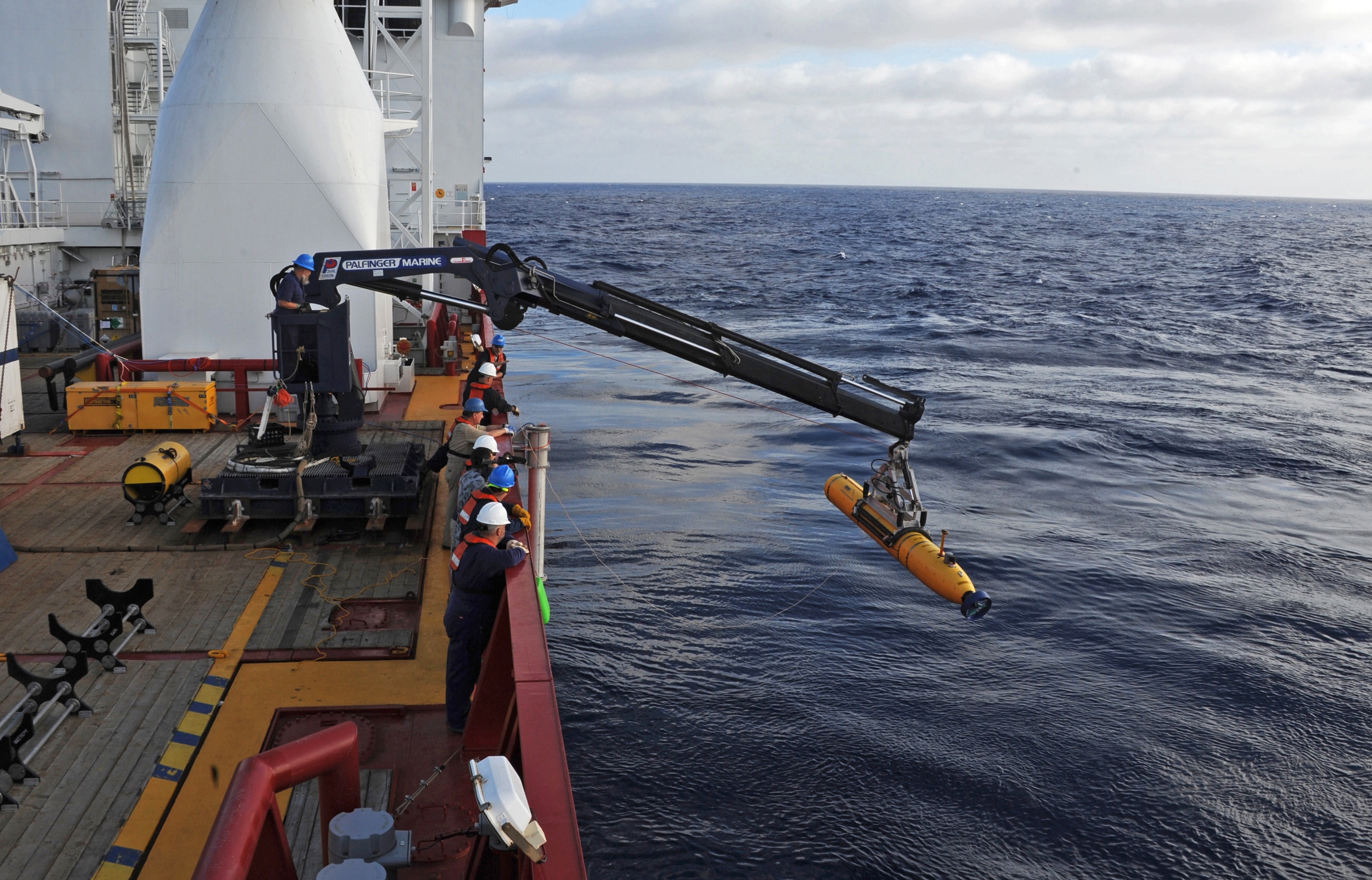
Ocean Shield deploying Bluefin-21 during the search for the missing Malaysia Airlines Flight 370 in April 2014.

In March 2014, Ocean Shield was sent to participate in the search for the missing Malaysia Airlines Flight 370, off the west coast of Australia. The vessel, fitted with a towed pinger locator on loan from the United States Navy, sailed from Perth on 31 March, expecting to begin searching on 3 April for the underwater locator beacon attached to the aircraft's flight recorders. Starting on 14 April 2014, Ocean Shield stopped towing the pinger locator and instead deployed the autonomous underwater vehicle (AUV) Bluefin-21, a sidescan sonar robotic submarine, to map the area.

The naval service of Ocean Shield was only intended to cover the drop in capability after the Kanimblas were decommissioned until the Canberra-class landing helicopter dock ships entered service. Once achieved, Ocean Shield would be transferred to the Customs Marine Unit of the Australian Customs and Border Protection Service, as a replacement for Ocean Protector, a sister ship operating under charter. Although the transfer was originally intended to occur in 2016 (when both Canberra-class vessels were in service and Ocean Protector's charter would expire), it was brought forward to 1 July 2014, and Ocean Protector's charter was terminated on 31 December that year. However, in 2016 Australia re-purchased Ocean Protector.

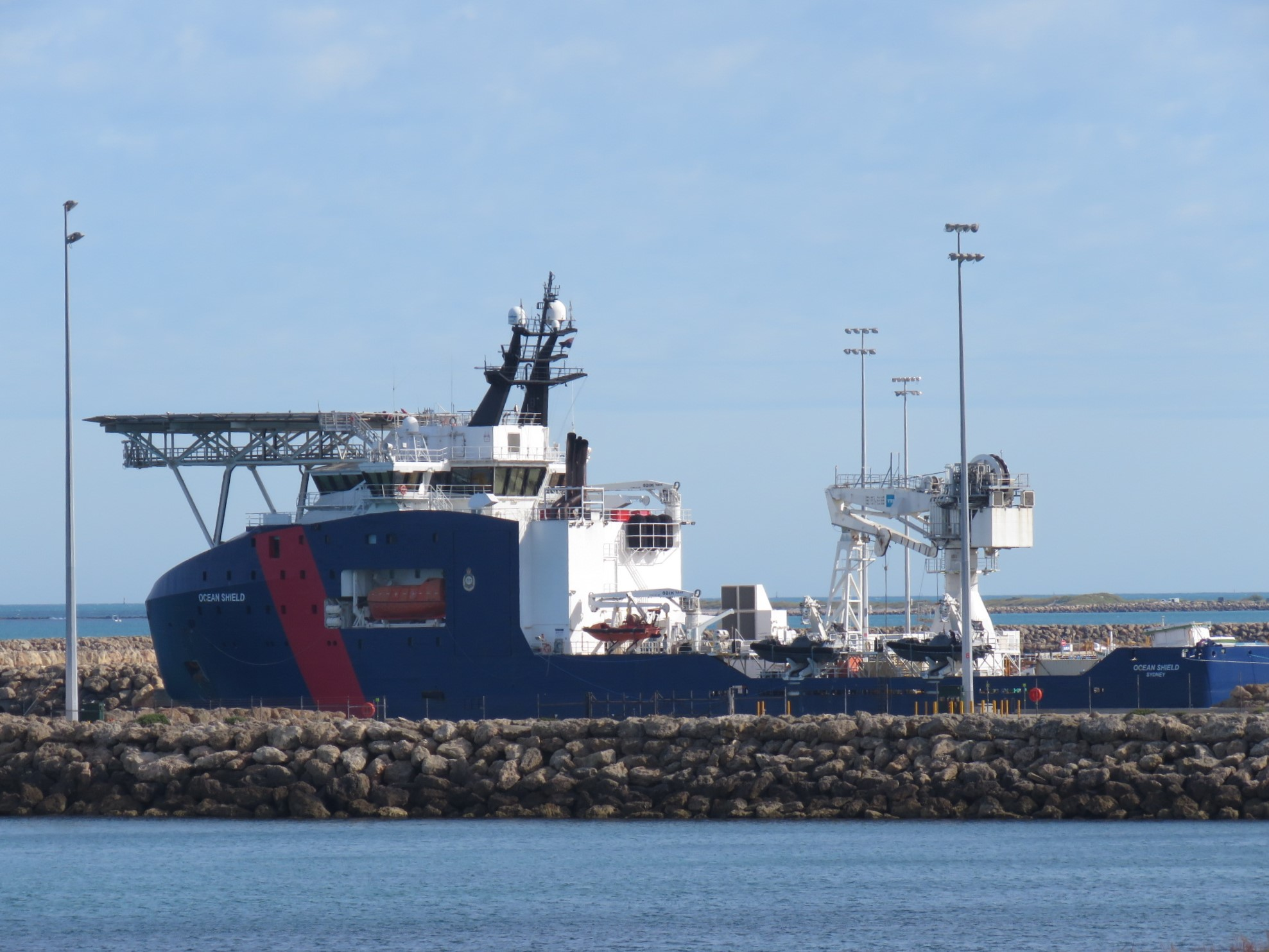
ABFC Ocean Shield at the Australian Marine Complex, Henderson, now in the colors of the Australian Border Force

After being transferred to Customs, Ocean Shield received modifications in Singapore and Hobart to improve its suitability for patrol tasks. The ship entered operational service in November 2014. It is funded to spend 300 days conducting patrols each year. In Customs service, Ocean Shield is armed with two machine guns, and received the ship prefix "ACV" (Australian Customs Vessel). Although primarily tasked to Australia's northern waters as part of Operation Sovereign Borders, Ocean Shield is capable of operating in the Southern Ocean.

On 16 April 2015, Ocean Shield commenced a 42-day deployment to the Southern Ocean: the first Customs patrol of the region since 2012.

Following the creation of the Australian Border Force in July 2015, Ocean Shield's prefix was changed to "ABFC" (Australian Border Force Cutter).
