= James Bellingham (roboticist) =

American roboticist

James G. Bellingham
- Education: Massachusetts Institute of Technology
- Known for: Autonomous Underwater Vehicles (AUVs)
- Awards: Bloomberg Distinguished Professorship (2015) National Academy of Engineering (2021) Lockheed Martin Award for Ocean Science and Engineering (2004) Navy Superior Public Service Award
- Scientific career
- Fields: Robotics, artificial intelligence, autonomous systems
- Workplaces: Johns Hopkins University Woods Hole Oceanographic Institute Bluefin Robotics Corporation Massachusetts Institute of Technology (MIT)
- Thesis: Magnetic Detection and Characterization of Electrochemical Reactions
- Doctoral advisor: Margaret MacVicar

James G. Bellingham is an American roboticist and ocean engineer who is the Bloomberg Distinguished Professor of Exploration Robotics at Johns Hopkins University, with joint appointments in the Department of Mechanical Engineering in the Whiting School of Engineering and the Research, Engineering, and Development Department of the Applied Physics Laboratory. He is executive director of the Johns Hopkins Institute for Assured Autonomy. He is also a member of the Data Science and AI Institute, where he serves as Director of Research, Safety and Assurance. He is known for the development of autonomous underwater vehicles (AUVs) and has led numerous scientific expeditions utilizing robotic systems for ocean exploration.

== Education ==
Bellingham earned his bachelor's degree, master's degree (1984), and Ph.D. (1988) in physics from the Massachusetts Institute of Technology (MIT). His first peer-reviewed paper was in astronomy, and he worked on superconducting physics for his Ph.D. Upon graduating, Bellingham shifted his focus to underwater robotics.

== Career ==
Following his doctoral work, Bellingham joined the MIT Sea Grant program. Bellingham founded the Autonomous Underwater Vehicles Laboratory, which he managed from 1989 until 1999. His work was focused on the design and operation of robotic systems capable of marine exploration and he pioneered a class of small, high performance AUVs, including the Odyssey series, which his team operated beneath Arctic ice in the early 1990s, taking steps towards under-ice mapping. During this time, he was also a lecturer in MIT's ocean engineering department.

Bellingham's first expedition was to the Bellingshausen Sea aboard the Nathaniel B. Palmer in 1992. Since then, he has led over 20 expeditions deploying autonomous systems for scientific research. His expedition work has spanned the Antarctic, Atlantic, Mediterranean, Pacific, and Arctic oceans. Using fleets of AUVs, he has helped collect high-resolution environmental data, map seafloor structures, and conduct sustained ocean observations in locations inaccessible to traditional crewed vessels.

For the latter half of the 1990s, Bellingham was the Principal Investigator of the original Autonomous Ocean Sampling Network (AOSN) Multidisciplinary University Research Initiative (MURI), which used fleets of small AUVs to create a large sampling network to observe and predict ocean processes.

In 1997, Bellingham co-founded Bluefin Robotics, an American robotics company that specializes in the design and manufacture of military and civilian AUVs. In 1999, Bellingham joined the Monterey Bay Aquarium Research Institute (MBARI) as Director of Engineering, and later served as Chief Technologist. During his tenure, he fostered a range of marine robotics activities including the Tethys Long-Range AUV.

Bellingham returned to the Arctic in 2001 leading an NSF-funded expedition to explore possible contribution of Atlantic water inflow to Arctic Ocean warming. His team participated in AUV observations in the Gulf of Mexico following the Deepwater Horizon oil spill, using autonomous vehicles to map the extent and behavior of subsurface oil plumes.

In 2014, he moved to the Woods Hole Oceanographic Institution (WHOI), where he served as the founding director of the Consortium for Marine Robotics. Bellingham also led the development of an Arctic version of the Long-Range AUV initiative focused on oil-spill response for remote locations.

In 2021, Bellingham joined Johns Hopkins University as a Bloomberg Distinguished Professor. Bellingham holds appointments in the Department of Mechanical Engineering in the Whiting School of Engineering and the Research, Engineering, and Development Department of the Applied Physics Laboratory. He is also a member of the Data Science and AI Institute where he serves as Director of Research, Safety and Assurance. He is executive director of the Johns Hopkins Institute for Assured Autonomy (IAA).

== Research ==
Bellingham's research focuses on the development of autonomous systems for ocean observation and exploration. His work encompasses vehicle design, navigation, high-level control, energy management, and design of multi-robot observation systems. He has made contributions to the development of AUV autonomy architectures that enable vehicles to make decisions and adapt their behavior based on environmental conditions. This allows for AUVs to descend to sea depths where radio connectivity and traditional navigation systems are lost in previously unexplored parts of the ocean. Bellingham has also contributed to the development of long-range AUVs capable of operating for extended durations supervised by humans from shore, expanding the scope of autonomous ocean observation. His research group has developed methods for coordinating multiple autonomous vehicles to efficiently sample oceanographic features across a range of spatial and temporal scales. Bellingham led the development of long endurance systems designed to allow observations of marine algal blooms from "boom to bust." These systems have been used for observations of algal blooms along the California coast.

Bellingham is also interested in the ethical dimensions of autonomous systems and fostering responsible development and deployment.

Bellingham has served on numerous scientific advisory boards, including Science Robotics, the Naval Studies Board, the Secretary of the Navy Advisory Panel, and numerous National Academy of Sciences studies. He has served on the boards of not-for-profit, privately held, and a publicly traded companies. He chaired the Naval Research Advisory Committee (NRAC) from 2008 until 2013.

== Awards and honors ==
Bellingham was elected to the National Academy of Engineering in 2021 for the “design, development, and deployment of autonomous underwater vehicles to advance understanding of the ocean and its resources.” He received the Lockheed Martin Award for Ocean Science and Engineering from the Marine Technology Society in 2004. He has also received the Navy Superior Public Service Award.

== Selected publications ==
Bellingham is the author of How are Marine Robots Shaping Our Future? Published in 2025, the book discusses undersea exploration and the role autonomous robots play in corporate and governmental aquaculture management, climate data, energy source locations, and shipwreck explorations.

=== Selected peer-reviewed publications ===
- 2021 with Y Zhang, J Ryan, B Hobson, B Kieft, A Romano, B Barone, C M Preston, B Roman, B Y Raanan, D Pargett, and M Dugenne, A system of coordinated autonomous robots for Lagrangian studies of microbes in the oceanic deep chlorophyll maximum, in: Science Robotics. Vol. 6, nº 50.
- 2018 with B Y Raanan, J Bellingham, Y Zhang, M Kemp, B Kieft, H Singh, and Y Girdhar, Detection of unanticipated faults for autonomous underwater vehicles using online topic models, in: Journal of Field Robotics. Vol 35, nº 5.
- 2018 with G Z Yang, P E Dupont, P Fischer, L Floridi, R Full, N Jacobstein, V Kumar, M McNutt, R Merrifield, B J Nelson, B Scassellati, M Taddeo, R Taylor, M Veloso, Z L Wang, and R Wood, The Grand Challenges of Science Robotics, in: Science Robotics. Vol. 2, nº 14.
- 1993 with T B Curtin, J Catipovic, D Webb, Autonomous Oceanographic Sampling Networks, in: Oceanography. Vol. 6, nº 3; 86–94.
- 2007 with K Rajan, Robotics in Remote and Hostile Environments, in: Science. Vol. 318, nº 5853; 1098–1102.
