= Digital Obstacle File =

Contains data on man-made obstacles

Obstacles in Alabama

The Digital Obstacle File (DOF) describes all known obstacles of interest to aviation users in the United States, with limited coverage of the Pacific Ocean, the Caribbean, Canada and Mexico. The obstacles are assigned unique numerical identifiers and accuracy codes.

These downloadable products are available at least 21 days prior to their effective date. Data updates (also known as "chart updates") are coordinated over 56-day cycles. There are six to seven of these updates per year. Editions will be listed by year and 56-day cycle number; for example, Edition 200801 was the first 56-day cycle of 2008 (i.e. February 14, 2008).
