= Fleet-class unmanned surface vessel =

Class of unmanned surface vehicles

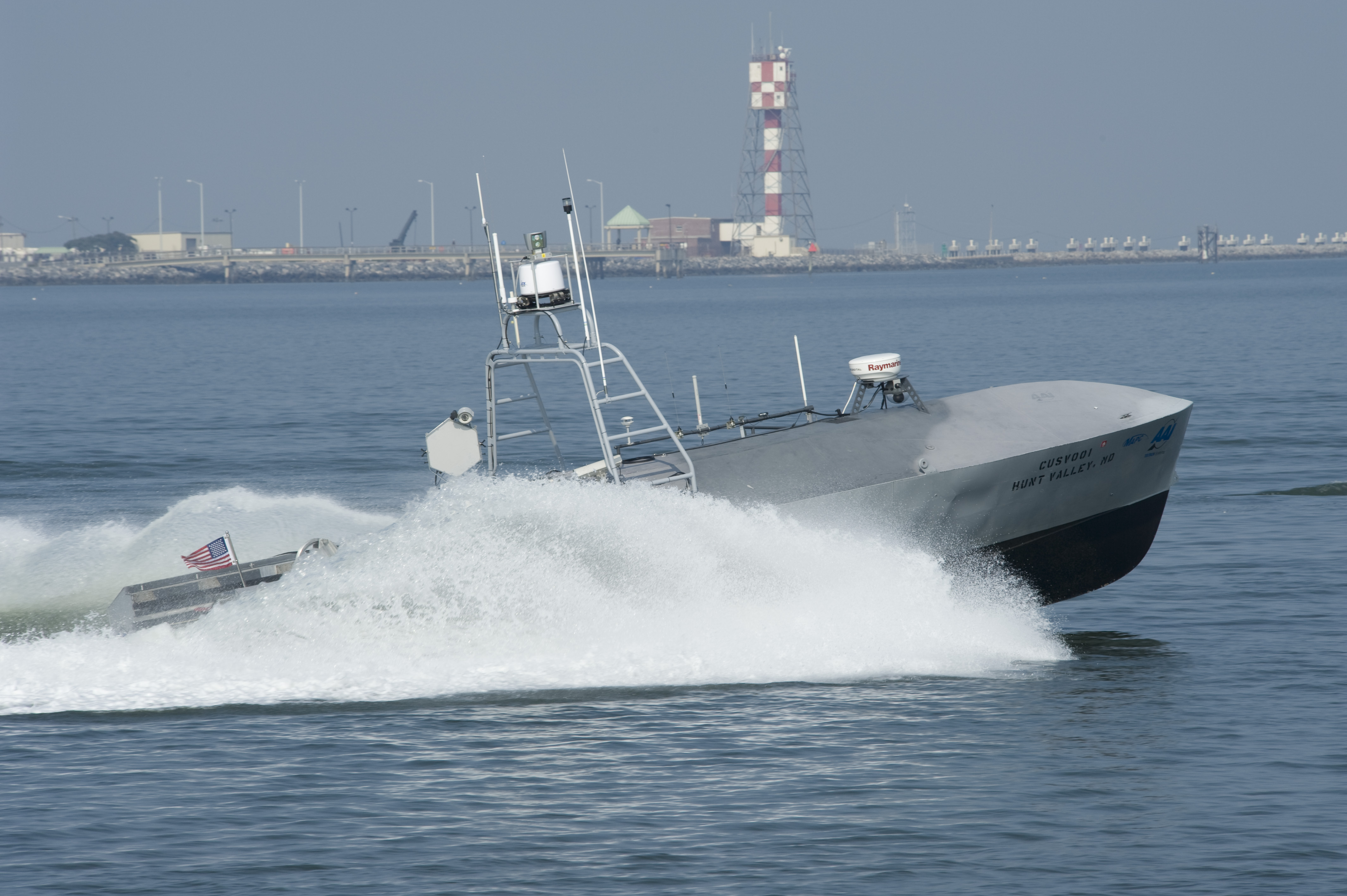
- A Fleet-class vessel in 2011

Class overview
- Builders: Textron
- Operators: United States Navy
- Cost: $5-6 million
- Built: 2008-present
- Completed: 4
- Active: 4

General characteristics
- Class & type: Fleet
- Type: Unmanned surface vehicle
- Displacement: 7.7 tonnes (8.5 short tons)
- Length: 39 ft (12 m)
- Beam: 11.2 ft (3.4 m)
- Speed: 35 kn (40 mph; 65 km/h)
- Range: 1,200 nmi (1,400 mi; 2,200 km)
- Endurance: 24 hours
- Capacity: 5,000 lb (2,300 kg) (4,300 lb (2,000 kg) towing capacity)

The Fleet-class unmanned surface vessel, also called the Common Unmanned Surface Vessel (CUSV) and later the Mine Countermeasures Unmanned Surface Vehicle (MCM USV), is an unmanned surface vessel designed for the United States Navy to be deployed from Freedom and Independence-class littoral combat ships and intended to conduct mine and anti-submarine warfare missions. As of 2012 four units of the class have been built; the first was delivered to the U.S. Navy in 2008.

== Design and development ==
Developed by AAI Corporation, General Dynamics Robotic Systems, and Maritime Applied Physics, the Fleet class Unmanned Surface Vessel (USV) is a small, semi-planing hull craft that is intended to operate in an optionally manned configuration to conduct anti-submarine warfare, special warfare, mine warfare and electronic warfare missions from littoral combat ships of the Freedom and Independence classes, being constructed using modular design to allow for rapid changes of mission through replacement of modules. 39 feet (12 m) in length and displacing 7.7 tons, the Fleet class is capable of speeds of over 35 knots (40 mph; 65 km/h) and can carry up to 5,000 pounds (2,300 kg) of equipment. The Fleet class is designed to operate for up to 48 hours without interruption.

Designed to match the weight and handling limits of a conventional rigid-hulled inflatable boat, the hull of the Fleet class USV is designed for good seakeeping in most sea states, and the vessels are equipped with advanced controls for autonomous navigation and operation. They are also designed to be converted to manned operation through the replacement of mission modules within a 24-hour period. The vessels of the Fleet class are the first unmanned vessels to be numbered as ships of the United States Navy.

As part of the LCS Mine Countermeasure (MCM) mission package, the boats will act as the Unmanned Influence Sweep System (UISS) (formerly unmanned surface sweep system (USSS)), where they will tow a countermeasure system that emits acoustic and magnetic signals to trigger and detonate influence mines at a safe distance. It is also capable of carrying other counter-mine payloads, including a side scan sonar and minehunting and sweeping unmanned underwater vehicles, as well as non-lethal weapons and intelligence, surveillance and reconnaissance (ISR) packages.

Due to reliability issues with the Remote Multimission Vehicle (RMMV), the CUSV is being considered as an alternative to perform minehunting in addition to minesweeping. It is also being tested for deploying off other ships besides the LCS, including a test from an Expeditionary Transfer Dock in fall 2015. The Navy will begin testing the CUSV in August 2016 to see if it can tow the AN/AQS-20A sonar; in 2011, movement of the USV on the water's surface rendered the sonar inaccurate, but since then software and isolation devices became available to compensate. The vessel could take over minehunting in 2020.

In January 2018, Textron announced the U.S. Navy was studying how to weaponize the CUSV for a surface warfare role. Various payloads are being considered including small missiles, remote gun turrets, and sensors and designators to act as a forward targeting node for larger ships.

In 2023, Textron was awarded a contract from the Office of Naval Research (ONR) for the development of the Magnetic and Acoustic Generation Next Unmanned Superconducting Sweep (MAGNUSS) system. The UISS towed sensor sweep cable proved to be less effective in shallow water because it could get damaged by underwater objects and had lower performance in low-salinity water. The MAGNUSS payload uses a high-temperature superconducting magnetic source with an advanced acoustic generator that sits within the hull of a USV, spoofing magnetic- and acoustic-triggered sea mines without needing to deploy and retrieve a tow cable.

== Operational history ==
The first Fleet class USV 11MUC0601, was delivered to the United States Navy's Naval Undersea Warfare Center in May 2008; the second vessel of the class entered service the following month.

In October 2014, Textron Systems won a $33.8 million contract from the U.S. Navy for the Fleet-class as the Common Unmanned Surface Vessel (CUSV). 52 boats are to be produced to equip 24 MCM mission packages with two vessels each, along with six for training and replacements. The CUSV completed its critical design review in November 2015 and moved into production in January 2016, with deliveries planned for early 2017 as part of Increment 3 of the LCS MCM package.

On 22 July 2022, the UISS reached initial operational capability (IOC), formally approving it to begin operating in the fleet. The full LCS mine countermeasures mission package (MCM MP) achieved IOC on 1 May 2023; in addition to the UISS, the MCM USV tows the AN/AQS-20C mine hunting and identification system.
