= Bluefin Labs =

Media analyst company

Bluefin Labs, Inc.
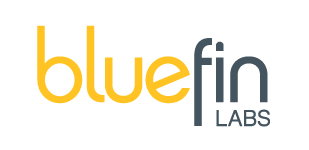
- Company type: Division
- Founded: 2008
- Founder: Michael Fleischman; Deb Roy
- Defunct: 2013
- Fate: Acquired by Twitter
- Headquarters: Cambridge, Massachusetts, United States
- Website: www.bluefinlabs.com

Bluefin Labs was a Cambridge, MA-based social TV analytics company that used publicly available social media commentary from Twitter, Facebook and blogs to measure viewer engagement with television shows and ads at scale – historically a costly and complex problem for TV and marketing industries to solve.

Bluefin's technology platform, grounded in 15 years of cognitive science and machine learning research at the MIT Media Lab, semantically interpreted people's social media comments and automatically linked them with the TV shows and ads they were watching. Bluefin's flagship product offering, Bluefin Signals, was a tool for accessing, interpreting, and analyzing this social TV data.

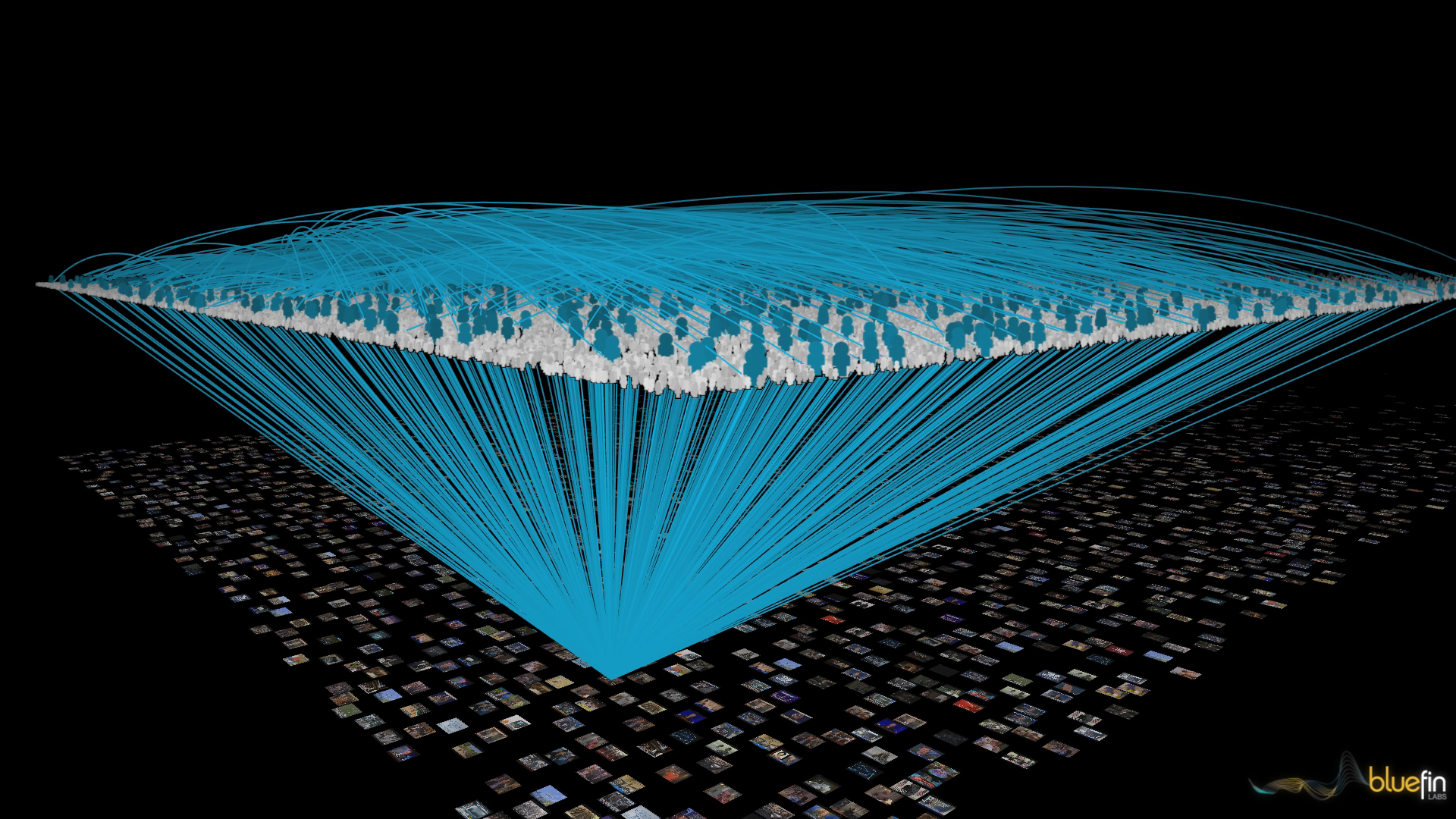
A data visualization from the TV Genome

== History ==
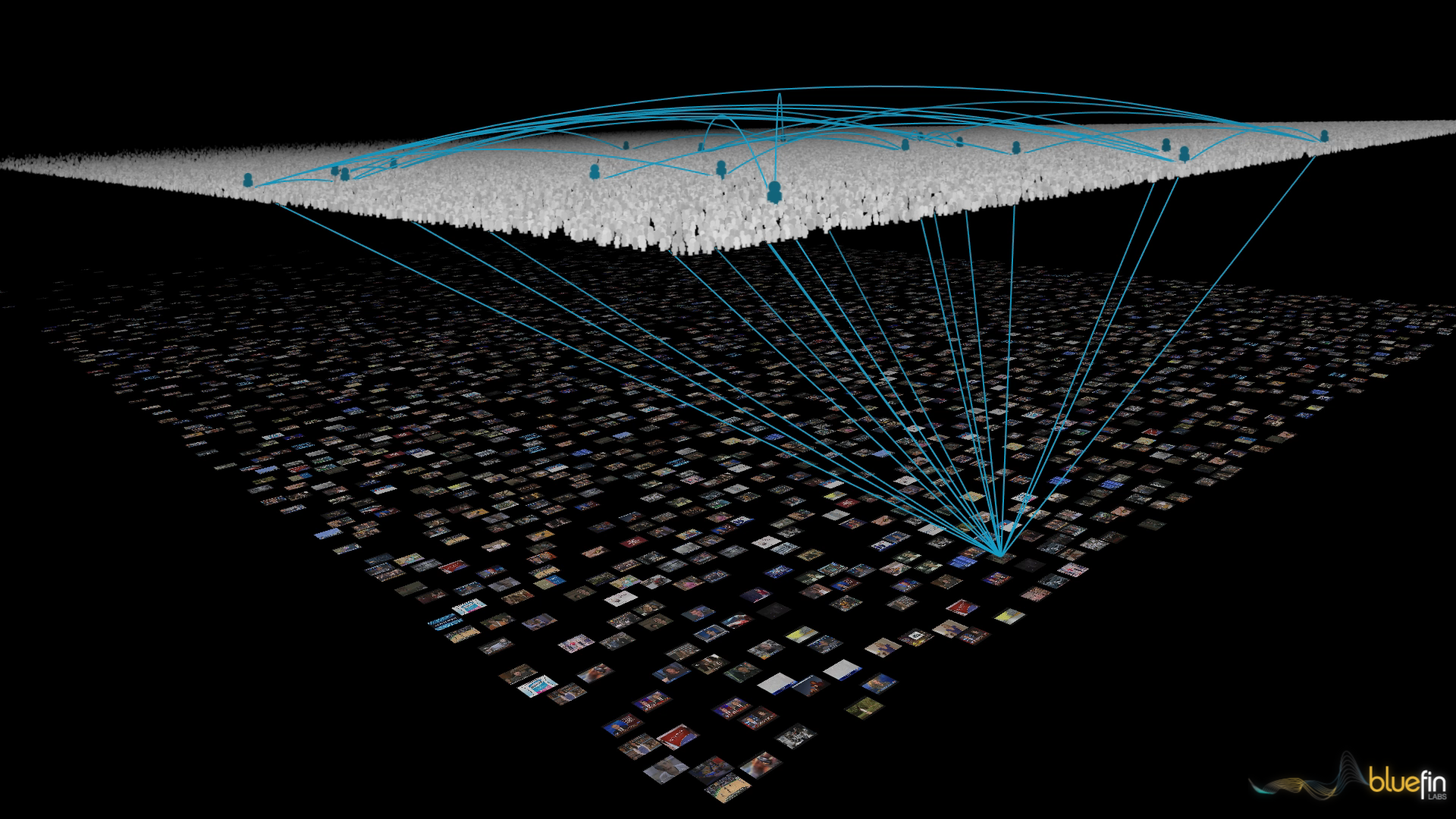
A data visualization from the TV Genome

Bluefin Labs was founded by Deb Roy and Michael Fleischman in 2008.

The seed for the company originated within the MIT Media Lab's Human Speechome Project (HSP). Headed by Roy, head of the Media Lab's Cognitive Machines group, the goal of HSP was to understand language acquisition by making a complete digital record of the first years of a child's home life and analyzing that record computationally. Roy and his wife installed video equipment throughout their home and captured much of their son's life from birth to age three - a total of 240,000 hours of audio and video. Buried in this massive corpus lay insights into how their son learned language at a level of detail never before captured. To sift through the data, Roy and his MIT team developed numerous deep machine learning algorithms designed to uncover the context and patterns within the audio and video data. Their results are explained in Deb Roy's TEDTalk 'The birth of a word.'

As a student in Roy's MIT group, Fleischman adapted the concepts of data driven designed for language acquisition and applied them to another massive video data set: broadcast video. Fleischman's PhD work garnered the attention of the National Science Foundation which awarded Roy and Fleischman a Small Business Innovation Research grant and effectively bootstrapped the launch of Bluefin.

Just as HSP created algorithms that can “ground” the meaning of a word within a larger context, Bluefin is using deep machine learning to ground the meaning of a given comment pulled out from a social media stream. By looking at the context of words expressed by individuals, Bluefin can use the meaning of these words to connect comments back to the events, people, places, products, and brands that caused those words to be expressed in the first place.

On July 32, 2012, Bluefin Labs announced that advertising industry veteran JP Maheu will join the company as CEO.

On February 6, 2013, Twitter announced that it was buying Bluefin Labs for approximately $100 million.

== Technology ==
Bluefin Labs uses proprietary algorithms to match social media comments to televised content. The methodology of associating comments to TV is composed of three parts: temporal analysis (looking at when a comment is posted), semantic analysis (matching written comments to what's on TV), and machine learning (the ongoing process of training and re-training the matching algorithm). Bluefin also employs a proprietary algorithm for sentiment and gender analysis of the social media comments.

The resulting data set is a large network of cause-effect links that measures people's engagement with TV, effectively creating a viewer/programmer feedback loop. This network is designed to provide marketers and media companies with insights that could be used for more efficient ad targeting and more informed content and creative development.

Bluefin calls this mapping of social media commentary back to its televised stimulus the "TV Genome" – a highly complex endeavor that, like the Human Genome Project, requires immense computational resources along with deep-rooted techniques in cognitive science and machine learning. Bluefin has a view into more than 5 billion public-facing social media comments each month, tied to a continuously growing video fingerprint archive of more than one million distinct airings of TV shows and commercials. Bluefin currently ingests and performs video fingerprinting of 115 U.S. TV broadcast and cable networks.

== Products ==
Bluefin Signals is a social TV analytics suite that measures and organizes the conversations about TV that take place in social media. It is a SaaS analytics platform and is available to Brands, Agencies, and TV Networks on a subscription basis.

Bluefin Signals is being used in various areas of the TV advertising ecosystem, including: research and audience insights, media planning and buying, TV ads sales negotiations, and TV ad creative development and optimization. Bluefin Signals processes an Electronic Programming Guide (EPG) feed as well as TV closed captioning to ensure accurate telecast-level analytics for social TV conversations.

Bluefin Signals Network Edition is used by over 40 of the top broadcast and cable TV networks in the United States.

Bluefin Signals Brand Edition is the first social TV analytics product built for brands.

== Board and investors ==
Early in Bluefin's development, Roy and Fleischman joined with technology entrepreneur Frank Moss (former MIT Media Lab Director, former CEO of Tivoli Systems) and media entrepreneur Brian Bedol (managing partner of Bedrock Venture Partners and founder and former CEO, ESPN Classic and CBS College Sports) to transition the company from research prototypes to a scalable technology platform tuned to the needs of the media industry.

Bluefin Labs received initial Series A funding by Redpoint Ventures, one of the world's top venture capital firms whose investments include: TiVO, Netflix, MySpace, Excite, Juniper, and Right Media.

In January 2012, Bluefin announced it had raised $12 million in a Series B round led by Time Warner Investments with participation from new investor SoftBank Capital and return investors Redpoint Ventures and Lerer Ventures.

Alongside Redpoint, top executives from the worlds of technology, media, entertainment, and sports have invested in Bluefin. In addition to Bedol, notable angel investors include Jim Pallotta (Raptor Capital Management); co-owner, Boston Celtics), Jonathan Kraft (president, Kraft Group and New England Patriots), Dan Gilbert (founder and chairman, Quicken Loans; majority owner, Cleveland Cavaliers), Kenneth Lerer (Lerer Ventures, co-founder Huffington Post), Jeff Samberg (Acadia Woods), John Fogelman (board member, William Morris Endeavor).

In its transition from pure academic research at the MIT Media Lab to private startup, Bluefin received funding from the National Science Foundation's Small Business Innovation Research (SBIR) grant.

== Partnerships and awards ==
Partnerships

- In December 2011, Bluefin Labs and Starcom MediaVest Group (SMG) announced a partnership that enables SMG to make more informed media planning and buying decisions for its clients through the use of Bluefin Signals.
- In February 2012, Bluefin Labs and ABC News announced a collaboration for coverage of key nights in the 2012 presidential campaign including on-air use of social media insights, analytics and data visualizations during ABC News broadcasts of Super Tuesday, the presidential and vice presidential debates, the Republican and Democratic conventions, Election Night and the inauguration.

Awards

- September 2011: Named one of VentureWire’s FASTech 50: Most Innovative Start-Ups
- September 2011: Named one of The "Digital 25: Leaders in Emerging Entertainment" by The Producers Guild of America (PGA), in association with Variety and in partnership with Digital Hollywood.
- November 2011: Winner of the ad:tech Innovation Award, Social Media category
- March 2012: Named one of Technology Review’s 50 Most Innovative Technology Companies
