= Phoenix International Holdings =

Marine services company for underwater operations

Phoenix International Holdings, Inc. (Phoenix) is a marine services company that performs crewed and uncrewed underwater operations worldwide.

== Notable projects ==
Notable projects in which Phoenix has participated include:

- 2022-Location and Recovery of a downed U.S. Navy F-35C Lightning II jetplane in South China Sea
- 2021-Location and Recovery of the fuselage of a downed MH-60S Seahawk helicopter near Okinawa
- 2019-Deep ocean salvage of a C-2A plane (location and recovery)
- 2014-The search for Malaysia Airlines Flight 370;
- Air France Flight 447, Yemenia Flight 626, Adam Air Flight 574, and Tuninter Flight 1153 black box recoveries;
- 2012-Search for Amelia Earhart airplane under a contract with TIGHAR
- 2011-Submarine rescue readiness exercise (Bold Monarch)
- 2010-Forensic inspection of the Deepwater Horizon control room;
- 2010-The design, fabrication, and testing of a Saturation Fly-Away Diving System (SAT FADS) for the U.S. Navy;
- 2003-The search for Space Shuttle Columbia debris;
- 2003-RMS Titanic documentary investigations and mapping projects;
- 2002-USS Monitor turret recovery;
- 2000-The discovery and forensic survey of the Israeli submarine INS Dakar;
