= DOF ASA =

Norwegian shipping holding company

DOF
- Official corporate logo for DOF Group ASA
- Type: Public
- Traded as: DOFG
- ISIN: NO0012851874
- Industry: Subsea engineering, Shipping, Vessel owner
- Founded: 1981 as District Offshore AS
- Headquarters: Austevoll Municipality, Norway
- Area served: Norway; UK; USA; Singapore; Brazil; Argentina; Canada; Angola; Australia
- Key people: Mons S. Aase (CEO)
- Services: Vessel ownership; Vessel management; Project management; Engineering; Vessel operations; Survey; Remote intervention; Diving operations
- Parent: DOF Group ASA
- Subsidiaries: DOF Subsea AS, DOF Management AS, Norskan Offshore Ltda, DOF Rederi AS
- Website: www.dof.com

DOF ASA was the parent company of the DOF Group, a Norwegian supply shipping company. DOF ASA underwent a bankruptcy process in the Norwegian courts in 2023 and on the 25th of May 2023, a new parent company DOF Group ASA was established and the company continues to operate as an integrated offshore services supplier with global operations.

== Background ==
Founded in 1981, the DOF Group is a global offshore services company combining asset ownership and project engineering to deliver integrated services to the offshore energy sector.

DOF offers a wide spectrum of offshore services including project management, engineering, survey, remote intervention, diving operations, ROV services, and vessel operations. As of the 31st of March 2023, the company operates more than 50 offshore vessels. This includes 11 platform supply vessels, 15 anchor handling tug supply vessels and 29 Construction Support vessels.

With main offices in Norway, DOF’s global operation centers and business units are in UK, USA, Singapore, Brazil, Argentina, Canada, Angola, and Australia.
