= Mobile Subscriber Equipment =

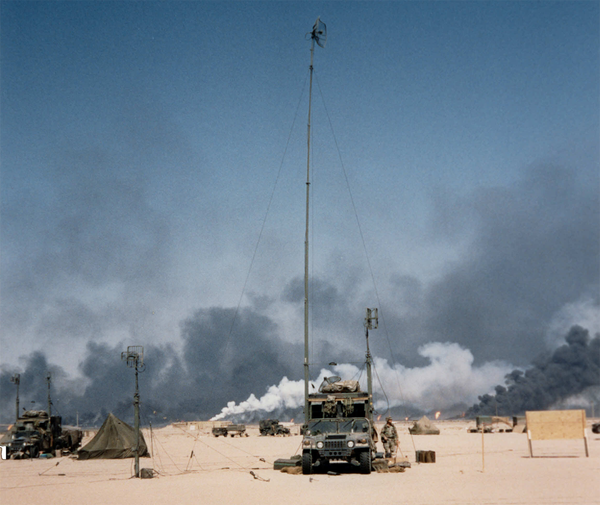
- Mobile Subscriber Equipment antenna trucks in use during Operation Desert Storm
- Type: Secure multichannel digital communications system
- Place of origin: United States

Service history
- In service: United States Army
- Wars: Gulf War; Kosovo War; Iraq War

Production history
- Designer: U.S. Army Communications-Electronics Command (CECOM)
- Designed: 1 October 1979 — 1 September 1983
- Manufacturer: GTE Government Systems
- Unit cost: Over US$4.3 billion (equivalent to $12.571 billion in 2024) (Project total)
- Produced: 19 December 1985 — 1 July 1993

The Mobile Subscriber Equipment (MSE) system was a tactical communication system created by GTE Government Systems (later acquired by General Dynamics) for the United States Army. Acquisition began in 1985 for echelons below Corps and down to the battalion level. The system was first fielded in February 1988 to the 13th Signal Battalion, 1st Cavalry Division at Fort Hood, Texas.

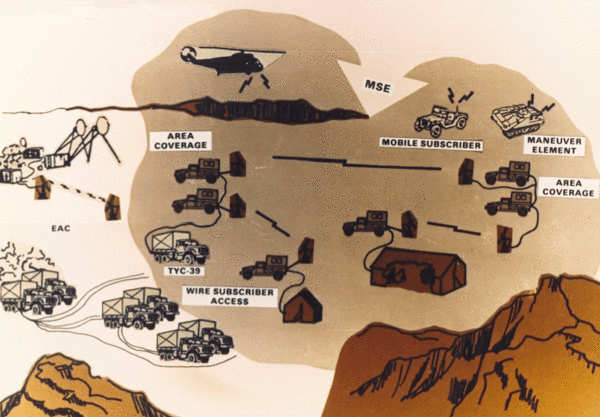
Mobile Subscriber Equipment concept

The first version included phones for both stationary and portable use, plus fax service. When a user placed a call, the MSE software automatically found the destination telephone and connected the call. Tactical Packet Network services were provided by BBN Technologies as a packet-switching overlay to the MSE circuit-switched network; these services added Internet Protocol switching and routing to support end-to-end data communications.

MSE was intended to provide communications support from the Corps' rear boundary to the division's maneuver battalion rear boundary, covering an area of approximately 37,500 square kilometres (14,500 sq mi). It consisted of the following major subsystems. The Node Center Switch (NCS) made up the backbone of the MSE system and provided connectivity through the use of extension switches, Large Extension Nodes (LENs), Small Extension Nodes (SENs), and Radio Access Units (RAUs). To communicate with other mobile and wire telephone users throughout the theater, the Radio Access Units allow the Mobile Subscriber Radio Telephone (MSRT) to interface into the MSE system through the NCS, LEN or SEN.

== See also ==
- Tactical communications
- Warfighter Information Network-Tactical (WIN-T) - successor to MSE.
