= Joint Network Node =

For military communications, the Joint Network Node system, or JNN as it is commonly called, is a communications system the United States Military uses for remote, satellite-based communication. It is described by General Dynamics and the US Army Signal School as "the next generation of battlefield communications."

The JNN is a system developed to replace the Mobile Subscriber Equipment (MSE) for the United States Military. It provides Beyond Line of Sight (BLOS) capabilities for the Warfighter.

The JNN system includes communication equipment mounted in shelters on HMMWVs, called JNN shelters, satellite terminals mounted on trailers, and communication equipment mounted in transit cases. There are two classes of transit case equipment: Brigade Cases and Battalion Cases.

The system's core is a Promina switch and cisco routers, with NIPRNet and SIPRNet capabilities, plus secure and non-secure voice systems, VTC, and the ability to link in older "legacy" systems, such as MSE, into the global network.

As a JNN operator, the JNN is run by a 5 kw generator, which can be on any of 3 phases for power while operating the JNN. The JNN is most commonly with a battalion or brigade element in the field. It is an ATH(at the halt) piece of equipment.
