= DOF Subsea =

International subsea operating company

DOF Subsea AS
- Type: Subsidiary
- Industry: Subsea
- Founded: 2005
- Headquarters: Bergen, Norway
- Area served: Global
- Key people: Mons Aase (CEO)
- Owner: DOF Group ASA (100%)
- Number of employees: 1200 (2020)
- Parent: DOF Group ASA

DOF Subsea is an international subsea operating company. The DOF Subsea Group is a specialist subsea service business that provides subsea construction, subsea engineering, inspection, repair and maintenance and survey services. DOF Subsea owns a large fleet of modern subsea construction, intervention and survey vessels that enable it to offer differentiated positions with its clients and work in long-term relationships. The company’s core business is project management, engineering, vessel operations, survey, remote intervention and diving operations, primarily for the Offshore Energy, Marine Telecommunications, and Renewables markets. The company's main operation centers and business units are located in Norway, the UK, the US, Singapore, Brazil, Argentina, Canada, Angola, and Australia.

== History ==
In 2008, DOF ASA and First Reserve Corporation, an energy-focused private equity firm, entered into an agreement whereby DOF ASA, subject to the certain conditions being satisfied, would put forward an offer to acquire all of the outstanding shares of DOF Subsea at NOK 39.00 per share in cash. As part of the agreement, DOF and First Reserve had also agreed to enter into several subsequent transactions if the offer was successful and certain conditions were satisfied. If the offer was successful, DOF would proceed with a compulsory acquisition of the remaining outstanding shares in DOF Subsea and delist DOF Subsea. Following the acquisition of the remaining shares in DOF Subsea (including the compulsory acquisition), DOF would transfer 100% of the shares in DOF Subsea to a newly incorporated private holding company (HoldCo), which would then be owned 51% by DOF and 49% by First Reserve.

== See also ==
- List of oilfield service companies
