= CSSC unmanned vehicles =

Chinese unmanned vehicles

CSSC unmanned vehicles (UUV)s are uncrewed vehicles developed in the People's Republic of China (PRC) by China State Shipbuilding Corporation (CSSC), most of which are in service with various Chinese governmental agencies/departments, and government-owned enterprises.

== Qilin ARV ==
History

PRC
- Name: Qilin
- Namesake: Qilin
- Ordered: 1
- Awarded: 1
- Builder: CSSC
- Christened: 2021
- Completed: 2021
- Acquired: 2021
- Commissioned: 2021
- Maiden voyage: 2021
- In service: 2021
- Status: Active

General characteristics
- Type: Bottom crawler
- Propulsion: Electrical (battery)
- Sensors & processing systems: Various
- Electronic warfare & decoys: None
- Armament: None
- Armour: None
- Aircraft carried: None
- Aviation facilities: None

Qilin ARV (Qi-Lin or 麒麟 in Chinese) is a type of very little known unmanned underwater vehicle (UUV) built in the People's Republic of China (PRC) by the 719th Research Institute of China State Shipbuilding Corporation (CSSC). ARV stands for Autonomous Remotely-controlled Vehicle, meaning the UUV is capable of operating both as Autonomous underwater vehicle (AUV) or a Remotely operated underwater vehicle (ROUV), an idea pioneered by American Woods Hole Oceanographic Institution (WHOI), which built Nereus hybrid unmanned underwater vehicle, the first of its kind entering production.

The idea of having an hybrid UUV that can both operate in fully autonomous and in remotely controlled modes is due to the inherit shortcomings of both: When the UUV operates in greater depth, the tether cable would become heavy and limit the mobility of the UUV, so fully autonomous mode is preferred in such operations. However, when the UUV needs to operate inside a wreckage or other complex structure, and needs make adjustment in real time, the cost would have become prohibitive because mission planning software must include all possible scenarios, which may not cover everything, so when there are plenty opportunities where the unexpected could happen, it would be far more cost effective to deploy a ROUV so human operators can adjust accordingly to the situation as it arises. Designing a UUV that can be both would be far more cost effective than having separate AUVs and ROUVs because one UUV can do the job for both. After the successful fielding of 7B8, Arctic series, Hadal and Hadal 1 ARVs, China has also developed and fielded Qilin UUV.

Development of Qinlin ARV formally begun in 2016, and after approximately half a decade later, was completed in late 2021. In comparison to earlier Chinese ARVs, the electrically powered Qilin is unique in that not only it can operate as AUV and ROUV, it is also a bottom crawler, thus combines the advantage of AUV and ROUV with bottom crawler thanks to its four legs that enable it to travel on seabed when needed. The mechanical legs of Qilin are designed by Huazhong University of Science and Technology, and the finally assembly was at Sea King Electrical Co. (Hai-Wang Dian-Ji Gong-Si, 海王机电公司). Qilin is designed to operating at a depth of a thousand meters. Specification:

- Propulsion: electrically powered
- Operating depth: 1000 meter

== Sea Soar UUVs ==
Sea Soar (Hai-Xiang, 海翔) series UUVs belongs to a family of very little known underwater glider developed by the 702nd Research Institute of China Shipbuilding Industry Corporation (CSIC) that merged with CSSC in November 2019, and as of early 2020s, a total of three models of this series have been identified:

- Sea Soar: also referred as Sea Soar 1, with operating depth of 500 meter.
- Sea Soar H: coastal version with hybrid propulsion, designed for underwater observation, ecological and hydrographical surveys.
- Sea Soar 500X: deep diving version constructed of composite material, and capable of carrying 30 kg of payload.

== Poseidon 100-1 AUV ==
Poseidon (Hai-Shen, 海神) series autonomous underwater vehicles (AUV)s belong to a very little known AUVs developed by CSIC that merged with CSSC in November 2019, and the first model of this series is Poseidon 100–1. Specification:

- Length: 1.7 meter
- Diameter: 0.18 meter
- Weight: 70 kg
- Speed: 5 kt
- Endurance: 10 hours @ 3 kt
- Maximum operating depth: 300 meter

== Poseidon 100-2 AUV ==
Poseidon 2 is a development of earlier Poseidon 1, and is designed to operate at a depth of 100 meters. Specification:

- Diameter: 0.324 meter
- Speed: 5 kt
- Endurance: 14 hours
- Maximum operating depth: 100 meter
- Payload: 62 kg

== Poseidon 300 AUV ==
Poseidon 3 has increased payload and greater operating depth than Poseidon 2, and is designed to operate at a depth of 300 meters. Specification:

- Length: 7 meter
- Diameter: 0.533 meter
- Weight: 1.4 ton
- Payload: 300 kg
- Maximum operating depth: 300 meter

== Poseidon 6000 AUV ==
As of early 2020s, Poseidon 6000 is the largest member of the Poseidon series, and also the deepest diving model in the series, capable of operating at a depth of 6000 meters. Specification:

- Length: 7 meter
- Diameter: 0.88 meter
- Weight: 3.5 ton
- Endurance: 24 hours @ 3 kt
- Maximum operating depth: 6000 meter

== Sea Ray wave glider ==
Sea Ray (Hai-Yao. 海鳐) unmanned surface vehicle (USV) is a wave glider jointly developed by the Qingdao Pilot National Lab for Marine Science and Technology (青岛海洋科学与技术国家实验室) of CSSC, and the 710th Research Institute of CSSC, and the general designer is Mr. Wu Xiaotao (吴小涛). Development begun in 2012, and became part of 863 Program in 2014, with the maiden voyage was completed on August 11, 2014, and the development was completed in 2017, with small scale production followed.

Sea Ray consists of three major subsystems: the unmanned surface hull with solar panel, underwater propulsion system, and the tether attaching the surface hull tether attaching the surface hull and underwater propulsion system. Sea Ray is currently used mainly for hydrometeorological, hydrographical, and oceanographic surveying tasks, and is thus equipped with BeiDou navigational system, communication system, CTD, ADCP and various other sensors for such missions.

== Sea Sentry wave glider ==
Sea Sentry (Hai-Shao-Bing, 海哨兵) USV is a small wave glider whose development is headed by Oceanic Dynamic Process and Climate Functionality Laboratory (海洋动力过程与气候功能实验室) of Qingdao Pilot National Lab for Marine Science and Technology (青岛海洋科学与技术国家实验室) of CSSC. The general designer is Mr. Sun Xiu-Jun (孙秀军), and the project became part of 863 program in 2014, and was completed in 2017. Sea Sentry has been deployed in weather reconnaissance missions to monitor the progress of Typhoon Bailu, Lingling, Mitag, Hato, and Pakhar.
