= Type 925 submarine support ship =

Chinese submarine tender and rescue ship

Class overview
- Builders: Hudong SY, Shanghai
- Operators: People's Liberation Army Navy
- In service: completed in November 1979 for use
- In commission: first ship started construction in 1975
- Completed: 3

General characteristics
- Displacement: 10,087 tons full
- Length: 512 ft (156 m)
- Propulsion: 2 MAN Diesels, 9,000 shp (6,700 kW), 2 shafts
- Speed: surface - 20 knots (37 km/h)
- Complement: 308
- Aircraft carried: 2 Z-8 Super Frelon helicopters
- Aviation facilities: aft helicopter deck and hangars for 2 Z-8 Super Frelon helicopters

The Type 925 Dajiang with NATO reporting name Dajiang, or 大江 in Chinese, meaning Great River, is a type of naval auxiliary ship belonging to the People's Republic of China. Each ship is usually equipped with up to two Type 7103 DSRV class Deep Submergence Rescue Vehicles (DSRVs). The ship is designed to replace the first People's Liberation Army Navy (PLAN) submarine tender PLANS Mount Tai, and the lead ship of the Dajiang class is the Changxingdao. The Type 925 is a submarine tender that can also be used as a submarine rescue ship, and hence, it is designated as a submarine support ship (Qian-Ting Zhi-Yuan Jian, 潜艇支援舰) by Chinese.

Each ship has a crew of 308 sailors and is equipped with an aft helicopter deck and hangars for 2 Z-8 Super Frelon helicopters. These large multi role naval auxiliary ships are the most fexilible type in the Chinese navy, capable of performing a variety of tasks, including serving as a submarine rescue ship (ARS), marine salvage rescue ship (ASR), submarine tender (AS), and surface ship's tender. Two Type 7103 DSRVs can be carried during submarine rescue operations and they are handled by a large crane on the fore deck, though usually, only one Type 7103 DSRV is carried while the slot for the second is used for a Type 7103 training submersible, which is used to simulate stranded submarines in training exercises. The handling system of Type 7103 DSRV is also used for Sea Pole class bathyscaphes and Osprey class submersibles. With only slight modifications, Type 925 Dajiang class is capable of supporting all submersibles and Unmanned underwater vehicles (UUVs) in the Chinese inventory, including:

- Mobile diving bell
- QSZ-II submersible
- 8A4 ROUVs
- RECON-IV ROUVs
- 7B8 ROUVs
- Goldfish class ROUVs
- HR-01 ROUV
- HR-02 ROUV
- JH-01 ROUV
- SJT-5 ROUV
- SJT-10 ROUV
- SJT-40 ROUV
- Sea Dragon-I ROUV
- Sea Dragon-II ROUV
- Explorer AUV
- WZODA AUV
- CR-01 AUV
- CR-01A AUV
- CR-02 AUV
- Intelligent Water class AUV
- Submerged Dragon 1 AUV

During the Chinese ICBM test in the early 1980s, one of the Type 925 Dajiang class was converted as missile instrumentation support ship and temporarily renamed as Yuanwang-3 (远望-3) to support the test, and after the conclusion of the test, the unit was converted back to its original role with the name consequently changed back.

With a displacement of 10,087 tons full, and a length of 512½ feet, this ship can reach a speed of 20 knots (37 km/h) powered by two MAN diesels producing 9,000 bhp (6,700 kW) delivered to the two driveshafts. The ships were built by Hudong SY, Shanghai. The Dajiang class submarine ship has three vessels. They are named as follows:

- Changxingdao #121 (built in 1976)
- Chongmingdao #302
- Yongxingdao #506

A new more modern Type 925 class has also recently been built, comprising:

- Yongxingdao 863 Replacing the # 506 with the same name.

| Type | NATO designation | Pennant No. | Name (English) | Name (Han 中文) | Commissioned | Displacement | Fleet | Status |
|---|---|---|---|---|---|---|---|---|
| Type 925 submarine support ship (AS) | Dajiang class | Bei-Jiu (北救) 121 | Changxingdao | 长兴岛 | November 1979 | 10087 t | North Sea Fleet | Active |
| Type 925 submarine support ship (AS) | Dajiang class | Dong-Jiu (东救) 302 | Chongmingdao | 崇明岛 | 1980s | 10087 t | East Sea Fleet | Active |
| Type 925 submarine support ship (AS) | Dajiang class | Nan-Jiu (南救) 506 | Yongxingdao | 永兴岛 | 1980s | 10087 t | South Sea Fleet | Active |

== See also ==
- Type 926 submarine support ship
- Deep Submergence Rescue Vehicle
- Military of the People's Republic of China
