= 8A4-class ROUV =

Chinese work class remotely operated underwater vehicle

The Chinese 8A4 class ROUV is a remotely operated underwater vehicle (ROUV) used to perform various underwater tasks, ranging from oil platform service to salvage and rescue missions. The 8A4 is a member of a series of related ROUVs developed by the Shenyang Institute of Automation (SIA) in the People's Republic of China (PRC). The predecessor to the 8A4 was the RECON-IV, an improved version of the American RECON-III. The 8A4 itself is an upgraded version of the American AMETEK 2006, and the 7B8 is an improved version of the 8A4.

== History ==
The 8A4's origins trace back to the RECON-IV ROUV. China has operated ROUVs to support its offshore oil and salvage operations since the 1980s, such as Hysub 10 ROUVs and Hysub 40 ROUVs supplied by the Canadian firm International Submarine Engineering in British Columbia. The Shanghai Salvage Bureau deployed Hysub 40 ROUVs and proved them to be a successful platform for offshore oil drilling, salvage, and rescue missions. However, foreign-built ROUVs were too expensive for wide adoption by the People's Liberation Army Navy (PLAN). As a result, China decided to develop its version of ROUVs with similar capabilities.

One of the first Chinese-built ROUVs was the RECON-IV ROUV, which was developed jointly by the Shenyang Institute of Automation of the Chinese Academy of Sciences and Perry Oceanographic (later purchased by Lockheed Martin) of Riviera Beach, Florida. The design was based on Perry Oceanography's RECON-III ROUV, and RECON-IV's development facilitated technology transfer between the two organizations.

The RECON-IV ROUV was adopted by the People's Liberation Army Navy for salvage and rescue operations. However, like earlier ROUVs, the RECON-IV was primarily designed for civilian operations, which limited military applications such as cutting through the specialized steel used in submarines, and opening valves on sinking vessels. The limitations of the civilian model and the needs of the People's Liberation Army Navy prompted a follow-up design.

== 8A4 ==
In the late 1980s, China organized a design team to develop a ROUV that meets the needs of military salvage and rescue operations while also being able to perform civilian tasks. Team members included the 702nd Research Institute of the China Shipbuilding Industry Corporation (CSIC), the Shipbuilding Engineering Institute of Harbin Engineering University (HEU), and the Institute of Underwater Engineering of Shanghai Jiao Tong University (SHJTU). Xu Huangnan (徐芑南), a professor of SHJTU, was named as the general designer of the 8A4 ROUV. He would go on to be the deputy general designer of Explorer AUV, as well as the general designer of other Chinese unmanned underwater vehicles, including Sea Dragon class ROUV, CR class AUV, and SJT class ROUV.

To shorten the development time, the team decided to select a ROUV system available on the market whose performance was closest to the requirements and then improve it based on experience developing the RECON-IV ROUV. The AMETEK 2006, an American ROUV used to support offshore oil drilling operations, met both of these criteria, so it was chosen as the basis for the new ROUV. However, the AMETEK 2006 still required extensive improvements to meet the design team's goals.

One of the major upgrades was the redesign and incorporation of two manipulators that could operate around half a dozen tools. These manipulators were completed by the main subcontractor, the Huazhong University of Science and Technology (HUST), and eventually won 1st Place in the Scientific and Technological Advancement Award of the China Shipbuilding Industry Corporation in 1996. It was also one of the first ROUVs in the Chinese inventory to have a Tether Management System (TMS).

The first 8A4 ROUV completed sea trials in 1993, operating at a depth of up to 600 meters, with a cruising radius of up to 150 meters. During its evaluation, the 8A4 ROUV successfully opened a submarine compartment constructed of special steel, a feat no other ROUV in the Chinese inventory could achieve. It subsequently entered service, and the 8A4 was thus dubbed the most capable salvage and rescue ROUV in Chinese service. In 1996, the 8A4 ROUV won 3rd Place in the Scientific and Technological Advancement Award of the China Shipbuilding Industry Corporation.

Despite industry recognition and awards, the 8A4's deployment is limited due to financial constraints. Except for the first unit, all the remaining 8A4 ROUVs have had their TMS removed due to the budget cuts, resulting in a significant reduction in performance, such as reducing the maximum operational depth by more than half. It was not until the early 2010s that TMS was planned to be reintroduced to all the 8A4 ROUVs to achieve their full capabilities.

== Dragon Pearl ==
Dragon Pearl (Long-Zhu, 龙珠)ROUV is a little known micro-ROUV designed specifically to work with the Jiaolong, operated by the Jiaolong's crew. Therefore, the maximum operating depth of Dragon Pearl is equivalent to that of the Jiaolong.

Specifications:

- Dimension: < 0.4 meters x 0.4 meters x 0.4 meters
- Weight: 40 kg
- Maximum operating depth: > 7000 meters

== Sea Crab ==
Sea Crab (Hai-Xie, 海蟹 in Chinese) ROUV is an experimental ROUV developed from the experience gained from earlier ROUVs. Sea Crab is different from previous ROUVs in that it walks on six legs to walk on the sea floor as a bottom crawler, rather than moving with propellers. Sea Crab was completed in 1984 and served mainly as a proof of concept unit, which lead to the development of later bottom crawler such as Sea Star described below.

== Sea Pole ==
Sea Pole (Hai-Ji, 海极) ROUV is a little-known remotely operated vehicle (ROV) developed from the 8A4 specifically for underwater explorations in polar regions. It has been successfully deployed since the second Chinese Arctic expedition in 2003.

== Sea Star ==
Based on experience gained from earlier Sea Crab bottom crawler, SIA jointly developed Sea Star (Hai-Xing, 海星) ROUV with Italian firm Sonsub. Equipped with two manipulators, Sea Star is a bottom crawler specifically designed for laying underwater cables on the seabed.

Specifications:

- Weight: < 10 tons
- Maximum operation depth: 300 meters
- Maximum excavation depth: 1.5 meters
- Maximum cable laying speed: 500 meters per hour

== Sea Star 6000 ==
While they are grouped in the same family by their developer SIA and share many technologies, Sea Star 6000 is distinct from the original Sea Star in that it has a maximum depth of 6,000 meters and is designed for scientific research missions rather than commercial applications.

Specifications:

- Length: 2.9 meters
- Width: 2.1 meters
- Height: 2.6 meters
- Weight: 3.5 tons
- Power: 35 kW
- Maximum operating depth: 6000 meters
- Depth positioning accuracy: ± 2 meters
- Directional positioning accuracy: ± 2°
