= Intelligent Water class AUV =

Autonomous underwater vehicle for the People's Liberation Army Navy

Intelligence (智水, Zhi Shui or Zhishui) class autonomous underwater vehicle (AUV) is a class of little known underwater vehicle developed by Shipbuilding Engineering Institute (船舶工程学院) of Harbin Engineering University (HEU) for the People's Liberation Army Navy (PLAN) of the People's Republic of China (PRC). The general designer of Intelligence Water AUVs is Mr. Xu Yu-Ru (徐玉如, July 1942-February 17, 2012).

== Description ==
The name of this class AUV, Zhi-Shui, is an abbreviation of Intelligent underwater robotic (Zhi-Neng Shui-Xia Ji-Qi-Ren, 智能水下机器人, with Zhi-Neng = Intelligent, Shui-Xia = Underwater, and Ji-Qi-Ren = Robotic). This class of AUV is developed based on the experience gained from Explorer AUV developed earlier, and the following models have been identified:

- Zhishui-I, the first model which is rumored (yet to be confirmed) used as a training and teaching aid instead of being deployed in the field. Development begun in 1989 & it entered service in 1994.
- Zhishui-II, which won the 1st place of China Shipbuilding Industry Corporation (CSIC) Science and Technology Advancement Award. Development begun in 1989 concurrently with Zhishui-I, and it entered service in 1994.
- Zhishui-III, development begun in 1996 and was completed in July, 2000, and it subsequently entered Chinese service aftering winning 1st place of National Defense Science and Technology Advancement Award in 2001, and 2nd place in National Science and Technology Advancement Award in 2002.
- Zhishui-IV, entered service after development completed in 2005.
- Zhishui-V, latest model of the series (as of mid 2021), first reveled in October 2011.

Zhishui-III has a similar appearance to earlier Explorer AUV, with a cylindrical body resembling a miniature submarine without the conning tower. Contrary to most other AUVs that are often powered by a single propeller, Zhishui-III is powered by twin propellers. The two shrouded propellers are installed just below the horizontal control surfaces of the crucifix control surfaces at the stern. Zhishui class AUV is claimed to be capable of performing a variety of tasks by the designers, but no details are released because it is designed for military application from the start, as opposed to other Chinese AUVs that are also used for civilian applications. Zhishui-IV is capable of operating in a depth of 1000 meters.
