= CAS benthic lander =

Unmanned underwater vehicles

CAS benthic landers (BL)s are a series of very little known unmanned underwater vehicles (UUV)s developed by Chinese Academy of Sciences (CAS) in the People's Republic of China (PRC). As of the early 2020s, a total of five have been identified.

== Canghai ==
In addition to the usual research tasks, Canghai (沧海, meaning Sea) BL is designed to incorporate photography and filming capability, but more importantly, it is designed to transmit the image/data/video footage back to the mothership or shore-based command center (via satellite) in real time, with the rate of data transmission via fiber-optic cable is faster than 5G, reaching 15G/second. To better perform filming and photography missions, Canghai BL is designed with a special feature in that it incorporates an unmanned underwater vehicle (UUV) Lingyun (凌云, meaning Reaching the Cloud) inside, and when filming, Lingyun UUV would be released from Canghai to work in conjunction with the latter to achieve better result. The cameras, lights, and fiber-optic network of Canghai and Lingyu are produced by CAS Xi'an Institute of Optics and Precision Mechanics (中国科学院西安光学精密机械研究所).

== Fenghuang ==
One of the shortcomings of benthic landers is that due to the tremendous high pressure at the depth, samples collected by BLs would lose their original characteristics and properties once brought to the surface. Fenghuang (凤凰, meaning phoenix) BL is designed to carry out some scientific experiments directly at the depth or on the seafloor, where the samples are collected, without having them being brought up to the surface, so that their original characteristics and properties would not be lost due to the drastic change of depth and associated pressure, resulting in these experiments yielding more accurate results. The general designer of Fenghuang is Mr. Li Jun (李俊), and Fenghuang entered service in 2018 after half a decade of development.

== Haijiao ==
Haijiao (海角, meaning Cape) BL is jointly developed by Shenyang Institute of Automation (SIA) of CAS and Institute of Deep-sea Science and Engineering (IDSSE) of CAS. Originally designated as Deep Trench 01 (深渊 01), it was subsequently renamed as Cape. In addition to other usual research tasks, Haijiao is tailored to hunt and collect animals on seabed. Originally designed to operate at a depth of 3,000 meter, it was subsequently upgraded to operate to a depth of 7,000 meter. Specification:

- Weight: 0.831 ton
- Diving speed: 30 meter per minute
- Surfacing speed: 40 meter per minute
- Maximum operating depth: 7,000 meter
- Endurance: 30 days

== Tianya ==
Tianya (天涯, meaning Edge of the Heaven) BL is also jointly developed by SIA of CAS and IDSSE of CAS. Originally designated as Deep Trench 02 (深渊 02), it was subsequently renamed as Edge of the Heaven. Originally designed to operate to a depth of 7,000 meters, the design was so successful that it was decided to expand the depth all the way out to 10,000 meter after completing its very first 7,000 meter dive out at sea in June 2016, and after three more attempts on the same trials for 7,000 meter dive that eventually surpassed 8,000 meters, Tianya finally succeeded in diving to 10,000 meters, and it has since been repeatedly deployed to that depth since. In addition to other usual research tasks, Tianya is tailored to collect geological samples from the sea bed. Specification:

- Weight: 1.053 ton
- Payload: 60 kg
- Diving speed: 30 meter per minute
- Surfacing speed: 40 meter per minute
- Maximum operating depth: 10,000 meter
- Endurance: 30 days

== Wanquan ==
Waquan (万泉, meaning Ten Thousand Springs) BL also capable of operating to a depth equal to that of Tianya, and in addition to usual research tasks, it is also mainly designed to carry various scientific equipment to that depth, and test them out to validate their designs. Wanquan BL is also tasked to perform seismological surveys on sea floor. Wanquan BL has successfully test out solid state lithium battery indigenously developed by China to a depth of more than 10,000 meters, making China the second country in the world (after Japan) able to produce solid state lithium battery that can withstand pressure of 100 megapascal. The pressure hull of Wanquan BL is constructed of ceramic material, the first of its kind in China. Specification:

- Maximum operating depth: 10,000 meter
