= Hadal ARV =

Unmanned underwater vehicles

Hadal ARV (Hai-Dou or 海斗 in Chinese, meaning Hadal) is a type of very little known unmanned underwater vehicle (UUV) built in the People's Republic of China (PRC). ARV stands for Autonomous Remotely-controlled Vehicle, an idea pioneered in China by Shenyang Institute of Automation (SIA) of Chinese Academy of Sciences (CAS), and SIA is also the developer of Hadal ARV and its predecessor Arctic ARV, as well as Hadal 1 ARV, the successor of Hadal ARV. Hadal and its predecessor Arctic series ARVs are the Chinese counterparts of Nereus hybrid unmanned underwater vehicle, because just like Nereus hybrid UUV, these ARVs can operate both as an AUV or a ROUV.

== 7B8 ARV ==
The origin of Hadal ARV can be traced back to 7B8 UUV, which is a further development of the 8A4 ROUV, and it is a Chinese transition from ROUV to Autonomous underwater vehicle (AUV) used by People's Liberation Army Navy (PLAN) Designed by the Shipbuilding Engineering Institute of Harbin Engineering University (HEU) based on the experience of the 8A4 ROUV with Mr. Deng Sanrui (邓三瑞) as the general designer, the 7B8 ROUV was first revealed to the Chinese public in Beijing during the National Science and Technology Exhibition of the People's Liberation Army at the Military Museum of the Chinese People's Revolution in 1995 while still under development, and members of the Central Military Commission headed by General Liu Huaqing was among those special guests.

The 7B8 ROUV is unique in that in comparison to other Chinese ROUVs, it can also operate independently as an AUV in addition to being operated remotely via tether/cable like ordinary ROUVs. The 7B8 first completed its trials as an ROUV in the 1990s and in 2000. Then it completed AUV trials including autonomously searching underwater targets and autonomous underwater work, and subsequently entered service. When the 7B8 is operated as an AUV, the maximum operating depth is less than when operating as an ROUV. Specifications:

- Length: 4.33 meters
- Width: 1.27 meters
- Height: 1.76 meters
- Weight: 1.69 tons
- Operating depth: 100 meters (when operating as an AUV)

The experience gained from 7B8 would lead to the development of Arctic ARV.

== Arctic ARV ==
Arctic (Bei Ji or Beiji 北极 in Chinese) ARV is an UUV developed by SIA, based on the experienced gained from other Chinese designs of AUVs and ROUVs. Unlike previous Chinese AUVs that are fully autonomous, Arctic ARV can be operated in both fully autonomous or remotely piloted mode. The fully autonomous mode is used for large area scan, while remotely piloted mode is used for small area of a particular spot when needed. Remotely operated mode is achieved via fiber optic cable connection, and Arctic ARV can hover over particular spot if required. Arctic ARV (北极 ARV) has been deployed on Xue Long and used in arctic explorations numerous times. Successfully completing all missions in July 2008.

Unlike earlier Chinese AUVs all of which adopted a cylindrical body, Arctic ARV is box-shaped, with draft greater than width, and there are tunnel thrusters at both ends of the ARV for better maneuverability. The main propulsion comes from a pair of ducted propeller thrusters with one mounted on each side. The composite buoyancy material is developed by Marine Chemical Research Institute (海洋化工研究院有限公司), of China Haohua Chemical Group Co. Ltd (中国昊华化工集团股份有限公司). Specifications:

- Weight: 350 kg
- Length: 2.1 meter
- Width: 0.65 meter
- Height: 0.7 meter
- Range: up to 3 km
- Hovering depth: 100 m

== Second generation Arctic ARV ==
Arctic ARV design has been updated, with weight reduced by nearly a half while still as capable as the original version, and this updated version is simply referred as second generation Arctic ARV in China. Development completed in early 2010s, and the ARV was first deployed in August 2014. Specifications:

- Weight: 180 kg
- Length: 1.7 meter
- Width: 0.65 meter
- Height: 0.92 meter
- Range: up to 3 km
- Hovering depth: 100 m

== Hadal ARV ==
Earlier Arctic ARV series has proven the idea of combining the capabilities of AUV and ROUV is feasible, and based on the experience gained, Hadal ARV was developed, formally started in April 2014, and completed in 2016.

Contrary to most UUVs that shape like fish,torpedo, or submarine, Hadal ARV is a rectangular shaped, similar to its predecessor Arctic ARV, and like Arctic ARV, Hadal ARV also has one thruster on each side. However, contrary to Arctic ARV which travels along its length, Hadal ARV travels along its width. Because Hadal ARV has to operate as an AUV when required, it carried internal power source, i.e. batteries, so it only needs fiber-optic tether cable for data transmission, and thus eliminating the heavy power cable. In addition to underwater camera, Hadal ARV also carries other scientific equipment for research pursposes. Specification:

- Weight: 260 kg
- Maximum operating depth: 11000 meter
- Length: 1.85 meter
- Height: 1.2 meter
- Width: 0.4 meter
