= Rainbowfish-class bathyscaphe =

Chinese deep submergence vehicle

History

China
- Name: Rainbowfish
- Namesake: Rainbowfish
- Ordered: 2013

General characteristics
- Type: Bathyscaphe
- Propulsion: Lithium-ion battery
- Complement: 2

The Rainbowfish-class bathyscaphe is a Chinese deep submergence vehicle under development in 2015 and originally scheduled to enter service in 2019, but has since been postponed after 2020.

== Rainbowfish bathyscaphe ==
The Rainbowfish bathyscaphe is a second generation bathyscaphe designed to be able to dive to a depth of 11 km (6.8 mi), effectively covering 100% of the oceanic floor. The general designer is Mr. Cui Weicheng (崔维成), who was the first deputy general designer of the first generation bathyscaphes Sea Pole and Jiaolong. Unlike other Chinese deep submergence vehicles developed earlier, the Rainbowfish was developed under a new business model, raising capital from private enterprise. To maximize efficiency after its completion, Rainbowfish-class bathyscaphes are designed to operate in conjunction with unmanned underwater vehicle (UUV) and benthic landers that are capable of operating at the same depth of the bathyscaphe, with all vehicles are developed by the same company, and all of them are also named after rainbowfish, operating from the same mothership, the Chinese oceanographic research ship Zhang Jian.

The Rainbowfish-class bathyscaphe is designed to have an endurance of ten hours, with ascent and descent each taking two hours, thus leaving a total of six hours of endurance to conduct research at the sea floor. The bathyscaphe is powered by lithium-ion batteries and the flotation material is developed by Chinese firm China Haohua Chemical Group, with development successfully completed at the end of 2014. Most of the subsystems of Rainbowfish bathyscaphes such as underwater electric motor, high pressure seawater pump and integrated propulsion system are developed from the earlier Jiaolong bathyscaphe. Although many subsystems can be 100% manufactured in China, there are some critical subsystems that had to be manufactured abroad due to the limitation of Chinese industrial and technical bottleneck, despite being indigenously designed in China. One of such subsystem is the capsule housing the crew. During the design stage of the development, it was discovered that the TC4 titanium alloy used on earlier Sea Pole and Jiaolong bathyscaphe are not good candidate for Rainbowfish, because the thickness required would be 110 mm, which would be extremely difficult to build. As a result, alternative material is needed, and the design settled on Martensitic stainless steel. However, existing Chinese capability can only provide the manufacture of capsule capable of diving to a maximum depth of 4500 meter, so foreign assistance was needed with Finnish firm selected due to Finnish experience in construction of deep submergence vehicles. Finnish experts concluded that the Chinese design was feasible after thorough review, both sides are finalizing the deal in the mid 2015, with the completion of the capsule scheduled in 2016. Plans are made to have future capsules manufactured in China by increasing domestic Chinese capability with governmental support. The mother ship carrying Rainbowfish bathyscaphe will be Chinese oceanographic research ship Zhang Jian.

An extremely crude full-scale model was displayed in public in May 2016 and it was reported that design completion date had slipped to 2020, and has been further delayed due to COVID-19 pandemic.

== Rainbowfish UUV ==
Rainbowfish UUV is will be working together with Rainbowfish bathyscaphe, which is completed in 2015, more than half a decade before the design of the bathyscaphe itself has been completed. Rainbowfish UUV is an ARV, which stands for Autonomous Remotely-controlled Vehicle, which is a hybrid of an Autonomous underwater vehicle (AUV) and a Remotely operated underwater vehicle (ROUV), and can operate as either one when needed, just like the American Nereus hybrid unmanned underwater vehicle developed by American Woods Hole Oceanographic Institution (WHOI). The general designer of Rainbowfish UUV/ARV is Mr. Hu Yong (胡勇)

Rainbowfish UUV/ARV is the first Chinese ARV that can operate to a depth up to 11,000 m (36,000 ft), but it cannot directly dive the that depth, instead, a relay station has to be used to support dive beyond 7,000 m (23,000 ft): the relay station and Rainbowfish UUV/ARV would be lowered from the mother ship to first dive to 7 km deep, once reaching there, the relay station would hover at that depth, and Rainbowfish UUV/ARV would continue dive, while connected by the relay station by a fiber-optic cable. Once reaching the maximum depth of 11 km, Rainbowfish UUV/ARV would perform its designed tasks within a range of four to five kilometers. Rainbowfish UUV/ARV has been completed in 2015, before the design of Rainbowfish bathyscaphe has even been completed, and has been deployed for multiple missions.

== Rainbowfish benthic landers ==
To maximize efficiency, the Rainbowfish-class bathyscaphe is designed to operate in conjunction with UUVs and benthic landers (BL)s. However, it was discovered during the feasibility study of the bathyscaphe that the Chinese benthic lander at the time could not reach the operating depth of the Rainbowfish bathyscaphe, so it was decided new benthic landers are developed concurrently, which were completed prior to the completion of the bathyscaphe itself, and have since been deployed for various scientific research missions. These benthic landers adopt the same name of the bathyscaphe, and a total of three models capable of operating at a depth of 11,000 m were developed by 2015:

- Rainbowfish 1 benthic lander: designed for underwater photography and video recording.
- Rainbowfish 2 benthic lander: designed for geological sampling on seabed.
- Rainbowfish 3 benthic lander: designed for collecting deepsea animals.

The general designer of Rainbowfish BLs are Mr. Pan Binbin (潘彬彬, 1982-). Just like the Rainbowfish ARV, Rainbowfish series BLs also entered service before the completion of Rainbowfish bathyscaphe, and has since be deployed for numerous missions.
