= Dajiang =

Dajiang may refer to:

- Dajiang (food), Chinese food
- Dajiang-class tender, Chinese naval auxiliary ship
- Da-Jiang Innovations, or DJI, Chinese technology company
- Da jiang, military ranks of China
