= Osprey class =

Osprey class may refer to:

- Osprey-class sloop, a class of five British Royal Navy composite screw-driven sloops, designed in 1874.
- Osprey-class minehunter, a class of twelve US Navy fibreglass coastal minehunters in service from 1993 to 2007 and now active with six other navies.
- Osprey-class submersible, a class of Chinese torpedo retrieval submersibles.
- Osprey-class PTF boat, a series of fast torpedo boats operated by the United States Navy
