= LR7 =

Crewed submersible undersea rescue vehicle

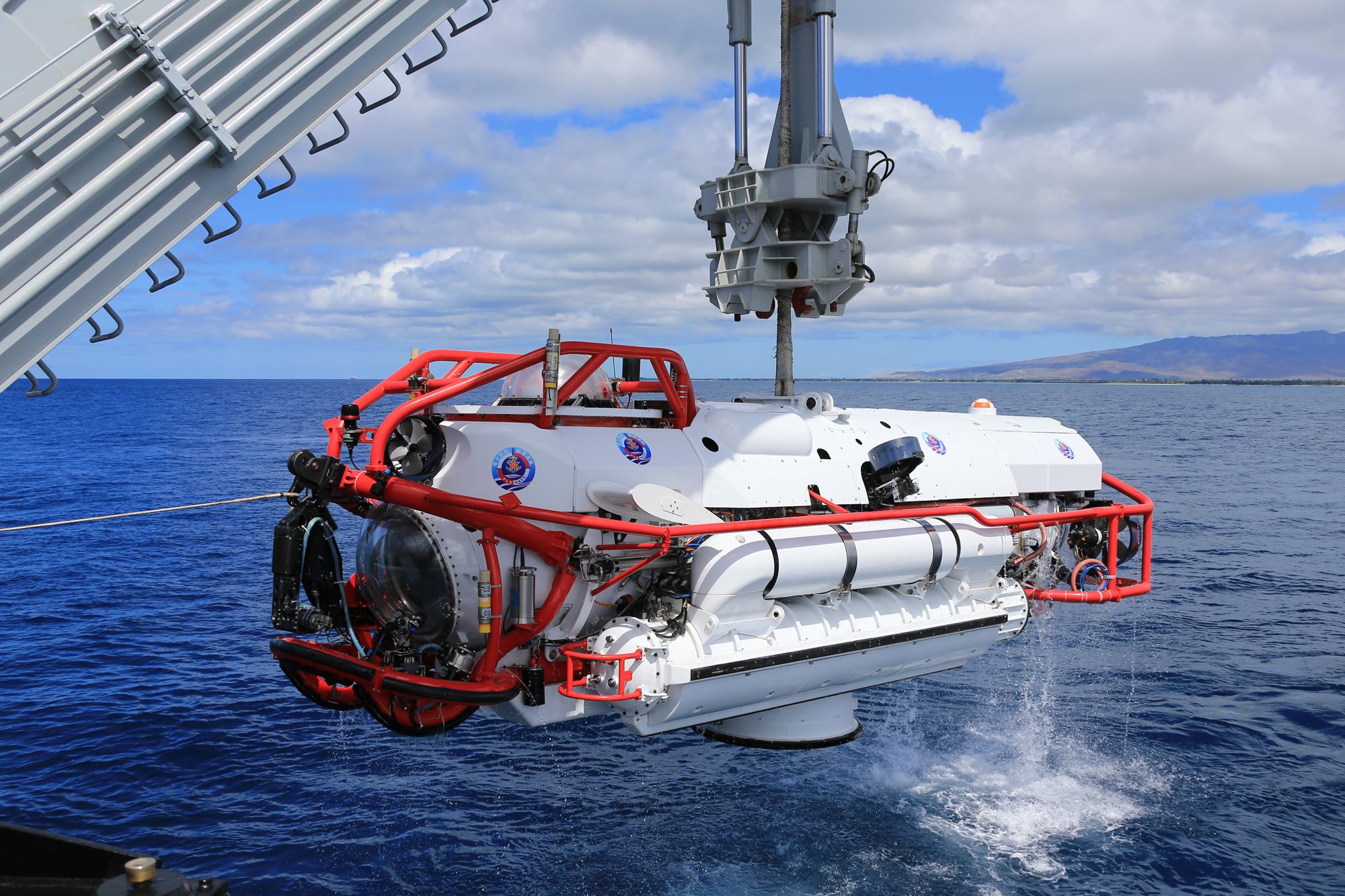
- The LR-7 being retrieved by Changdao during RIMPAC 2016.

Class overview
- Builders: Forum Energy Technologies (FET)
- Operators: People's Liberation Army Navy
- Preceded by: 35-ton deep-submergence rescue vehicle
- In service: 2009 - present

History

People's Republic of China
- Name: LR7
- In service: 2009
- Status: Active

General characteristics
- Type: Deep-submergence rescue vehicle
- Displacement: 38 tons (full)
- Length: 9.6 metres (31 ft)
- Beam: 3.2 metres (10 ft)
- Draught: 3.4 metres (11 ft)
- Installed power: Lead-acid batteries
- Propulsion: 2 x electric motors (26.8 horsepower (20.0 kW)); 4 x tilting side thrusters (16 horsepower (12 kW))
- Speed: 3 knots (5.6 km/h; 3.5 mph)
- Capacity: 18 survivors
- Crew: 3

The LR7 is a deep-submergence rescue vehicle (DSRV) of the People's Republic of China's People's Liberation Army Navy (PLAN). It was built by FET (Forum Energy Technologies) formerly Perry Slingsby of Britain. The LR7 entered service in 2009.

== Development ==
In 2000 and 2001, Chinese representatives attended international submarine rescue conferences and exercises. This may have followed the 2003 accident suffered by Chinese submarine 361 while surfaced leading to the deaths of the entire crew. China entered negotiations to purchase DSRVs from Britain or Canada which may have resulted in the order for the LR7 through Rolls-Royce Marine.

The LR7 was tested in Loch Linnhe, Scotland, in September 2008. It was delivered and entered service in 2009.

The Type 926 submarine support ship was developed to deploy the LR7. The first was laid down in 2007 and entered service in 2010.

== Design ==
The LR7 may operate at depths of 500 meters and may dock with submarines with their bows 60 degrees up.

Originally Manufactured by Perry Slingsby Systems and is now Forum Energy Technologies (FET).

== Sources ==
- Saunders, Stephan, ed. (2015). Jane's Fighting Ships 2015-2016. Jane's Information Group. ISBN 978-0710631435.
- Wertheim, Eric (2013). The Naval Institute Guide to Combat Fleets of the World: Their Ships, Aircraft, and Systems (16 ed.). Annapolis, Maryland: Naval Institute Press. ISBN 978-1591149545.
