= Sun Bo (executive) =

Chinese business executive

- 孙波
- Born: 1961 (age 64–65); China
- Education: Dalian University of Technology
- Occupations: Executive, engineer
- Years active: 1982–2018
- Agent: China Shipbuilding Industry Corporation (CSIC)
- Political party: Chinese Communist Party (expelled)

Chinese name
- Traditional Chinese: 孫波
- Simplified Chinese: 孙波
Transcriptions
Standard Mandarin
- Hanyu Pinyin: Sūn Bō

Sun Bo (Chinese: 孙波; born 1961) is a Chinese business executive and engineer who served as General Manager of China Shipbuilding Industry Corporation (CSIC). He was arrested for allegedly giving classified details about the Liaoning to the CIA.

On June 16, 2018, he was placed under investigation for alleged graft and corruption. Later reports suggested that Sun had handed over key details of the aircraft carrier Liaoning to CIA.

== Career ==
Born in 1961, Sun graduated from Dalian University of Technology in August 1982. He spent 27 years working at Dalian Shipbuilding Industry Co., Ltd before serving as General Manager of China Shipbuilding Industry Corporation (CSIC), a position at vice-ministerial level.

== Arrest ==
On June 16, 2018, he was put under investigation for alleged "serious violations of discipline and laws", a brief statement issued by the Central Commission for Discipline Inspection (CCDI). On December 27, he was expelled from the Chinese Communist Party (CCP) and removed from public office.

On January 6, 2019, he was detained. On January 30, he was indicted on suspicion of accepting bribes and abuse of power.

On July 4, 2019, Sun was sentenced to 12 years in prison for taking bribes of 8.64 million yuan and abuse of power by Shanghai First Intermediate People's Court. His superior, Hu Wenming, former chairman of China State Shipbuilding Corporation, was placed under investigation by the Central Commission for Discipline Inspection in December 2020.
