= Hadal 1 ARV =

Chinese submarine drone

History

PRC
- Name: Hadal
- Namesake: Hadal zone
- Ordered: 1
- Awarded: 1
- Builder: SIA
- Launched: 2019
- Christened: 2019
- Completed: 2019
- Acquired: 2019
- Commissioned: 2019
- Maiden voyage: 2019
- Status: Active

Class overview
- Operators: People's Liberation Army Navy
- Preceded by: Hadal ARV
- Built: 2016-2019
- In service: 2019 onward
- In commission: 2019 onward
- Planned: 1
- Completed: 1
- Active: 1

General characteristics
- Type: Hybrid UUV
- Length: 3.8 m (12 ft 6 in)
- Propulsion: Electrical (battery)
- Sensors & processing systems: Various
- Electronic warfare & decoys: None
- Armament: None
- Armour: None
- Aircraft carried: None
- Aviation facilities: None

Hadal 1 ARV (Hai-Dou 1 or 海斗 1 in Chinese, meaning Hadal 1) is a type of unmanned underwater vehicle (UUV) built in the People's Republic of China (PRC). ARV stands for Autonomous Remotely-controlled Vehicle, an idea pioneered in China by Shenyang Institute of Automation (SIA) of Chinese Academy of Sciences (CAS), and SIA is also the developer of Hadal 1 ARV, and its predecessor Hadal ARV, as well as Arctic ARV, the predecessor of Hadal ARV. Hadal 1 and its predecessor Hadal, and earlier Arctic series ARVs are the Chinese counterparts of Nereus hybrid unmanned underwater vehicle (UUV), because just like Nereus hybrid UUV, these ARVs can operate both as a AUV or a ROUV. The general designer of Hadal 1 ARV is Mr. Tang Yuan-Gui (唐元贵).

A UUV able to switch between fully autonomous and remotely controlled modes is advantageous. When the UUV operates in greater depth, the tether cable would become heavy and limit the mobility of the UUV, so fully autonomous mode is preferred in such operations. However, when the UUV needs to operate inside wreckage or other complex structures, and need make adjustment in real time, the cost would have become prohibitive because mission planning software must include all possible scenarios, which may not cover everything, so when there are plenty opportunities of unexpected would happen, it would be far more cost effective to deploy a ROUV so human operators can adjust accordingly to the situation arose. Designing an UUV that can be both would be far more cost effective than having separate AUVs and ROUVs because one UUV can do the job for both. Earlier Arctic ARV series and Hadal ARVs have proven the idea is feasible, and based on the experience gained, Hadal ARV was developed. The project formally started in July 2016, and development was completed in 2019. Like its predecessor Hadal ARV and earlier Arctic ARVs, Hadal 1 ARV is also having a rectangular hull, with a thruster on each side. Because Hadal 1 ARV has to operate as an AUV when required, it carries internal power source, i.e. batteries, so it only needs a fiber-optic tether cable for data transmission, and thus eliminates the heavy power cable. Specification:

- Length: 3.8 meter
- Maximum operating depth: 11000 meter
- Range: > 14 km
- Endurance: > 8 hours in AUV mode, > 10 hours in ARV mode
