= Osprey-class submersible =

Class of submersible of the People's Liberation Army Navy

History

People's Liberation Army Navy
- Name: Osprey class submersible
- Ordered: 2
- Awarded: 2
- Builder: Wuchang Shipbuilding Factory
- Sponsored by: PLAN
- Completed: 1988
- Acquired: 1989
- Commissioned: 1989
- Maiden voyage: 1988
- In service: 1989
- Status: In active service

General characteristics
- Type: submersible
- Displacement: 14.18 t
- Length: 7.3 m (24 ft)
- Beam: 2.7 m (8.9 ft)
- Draft: 3.35 m (11.0 ft)
- Installed power: batteries
- Propulsion: electrical-hydraulic hybrid
- Speed: 2 kt
- Endurance: 72 h
- Test depth: 200 m (660 ft)
- Complement: 3
- Sensors & processing systems: sonar & search lights

Osprey class submersible is a class of submersible of the People's Liberation Army Navy (PLAN) specially designed to perform torpedo retrieving missions at test ranges. This class submersible was highly classified when it originally entered service in 1989, and it was not until more than a decade later in the mid of the first decade of the 21st century when it was revealed to the public, when one of the design team members, the deputy general designer Mr. Sun Xin (孙欣), was publicized in a 2006 interview to disclose some characteristics of the submersible. This class is currently consisted of two boats, Osprey 1 (鱼鹰1号, Yu Ying Yi Hao) and Osprey 2 (鱼鹰2号, Yu Ying Er Hao).

== Origin ==
In 1969, the 705th Research Institute of China Shipbuilding Industry Corporation (CSIC) led a team consisting of more than eighty research establishments and factories had completed No. 750 Deep Water Test Range, which was the main test range for Chinese torpedoes, depth charges and naval mines. However, the test range has serious limitations when the naval weaponry tested sunk to the bottom, because there was no equipment at the time to salvage the test samples at the bottom of the test range. In addition to the financial and economical loss, the more damaging result was that the technical data was unavailable as the weaponry could not be retrieved from the bottom of the test range, thus greatly hindering the development of naval weaponry tested.

To overcome this shortcoming, a submersible that was capable of retrieving the test samples sunk to the bottom of the test range was needed. A joint design team headed by the 710th Research Institute of CISC was tasked to develop such as submersible, and after much debate, a crewed submersible was chosen over the uncrewed version. Designer would later claim that the success of Osprey class submersible would reaffirm the belief that a crewed submersible would be better the uncrewed version, when operating in an environment with an average depth of at least a hundred meters.

== Design ==
Though the maximum depth of Osprey class submersible is only two hundred meters, the difficulties faced was much greater than that of designing a regular submarine, because of the unique requirements of the submersible. China had never designed anything similar before, and nearly everything in its design was needed to adopt technologies that were new to China, most which had to be indigenously developed. New methodologies and technologies developed and adopted for Osprey class included:

- New simulation model that provided the optimum layout for the main thruster and auxiliary thruster to provide optimum handling during navigation in the water.
- Application of ergonomics which was a relatively new concept in China in the 1970s to obtain the optimum layout of the three observation windows and the seats for operators.
- First successful electrical – hydraulic hybrid control system in China. Instead of a direct current or an alternate current electrical propulsion system, the propulsion system of Osprey class submersible adopted a highly risky propulsion system that is not hydraulic either, but a hybrid system that was a cross between hydraulic and electrical systems. The resulting hybrid system not only provided good handling characteristics, but was also economical, with much lowered operating cost in comparison to other systems.
- One of the first project of its kind in China to be designed as an entire system in which the Osprey class submersible is part of the bigger system that included the mother ship, shore facilities such as pier equipment and storage facilities. As a result, anything that could not be salvaged by the submersible itself (with negative buoyancy of 1.2 ton or greater) could be easily salvaged by the mother ship with the help of the submersible.
- Nitrogen filled battery compartment had effectively reduced and eliminated the potential fire hazard of released hydrogen

Much work was devoted to the careful design of the general layout, pressure hull and other unpressurized compartments, main and auxiliary propulsion systems, hydraulic systems, auxiliary power unit and piping system, electrical system, observation and navigational systems, underwater lighting system, salvage system, life support and safety system. This resulted in the optimum compromise reached for the best performance, which was claimed to be equal to that of foreign designs, and in some areas, such as hovering and sideway movements, designers of Osprey submersible have claimed that it outperforms its foreign counterparts. The submersible is capable of hovering three meters above the bottom without stirring up the sediment, thus enables its operator to clearly observe objects ten meters away at the bottom.

== Structure ==
There are a total of three large observation windows located in the frontal half of the submersible, and a total of two manipulators. One of the manipulators with 3 degrees of freedom (DOF) has the capacity of carrying 1.2 ton, while the remaining smaller manipulator with 6-DOF has the capacity of carrying 32 kg. The submersible is equipped with an advanced color imaging sonar designated as Model 971, jointly developed by Simrad Optronics Group and Kongsberg Mesotech in the early 1980s. Because of the limited Chinese industrial capability at the time, China could not produce a similar system on its own and such system had to be imported from abroad. The salvage system on board the submersible consists of manipulators, salvage cables made of stainless steel, buoys and nylon cables attaching to the buoys.

The propulsion system of Osprey class submersible is the most significant features that differentiate it from other conventional submarines. Instead of using electric motor as most other submersibles in the world, the propulsion system is hybrid electrical – hydraulic system with the thrusts powered by a hydraulic system. The main shrouded propeller is located in the center of the crucifix control surfaces at the stern, which enables the submersible to turn in the horizontal plan, but the main shrouded propeller cannot control the motion in the vertical plan, which is controlled by auxiliary propellers. These auxiliary propulsion systems also enable the submersibles to move sideways. Hydraulic system is selected for its high efficiency, compact size, light weight and the ease of installation, and with the thrusters installed outside the pressure hull, there no need to penetrate the pressure hull like the main propulsion axis of the conventional submarines. The operation of the submersible is different from that of a submarine, but somewhat similar to that of a helicopter instead.

== Deployment ==
Designers decided that it would be impractical and uneconomical to use Osprey submersible to search the entire test range on its own during its deployment, so a system of different search patterns was established to locate the test sample on the bottom of the test range. As the mother ship carried the Osprey submersible to the test range, the area would be first scanned by the mother ship by its side-looking sonar or other means such as information based on the last recorded data. Once an approximate location is narrowed down to an area about one square kilometer, a second stage of search would begin with the submersible entering the water. The color imaging Model 971 sonar would search the area and identify the potential target. After the target is identified, it would be visually confirmed by the operator under illumination in the third stage of search as the submersible approaches the target. With target being confirmed, salvage operations could begin with first washing off the sediments that the target is buried under.

When the test sample of the naval weaponry at the bottom of the test range is less than 100 kg, it would directly carried by the manipulator to the surface. If the weight of the test sample is greater than 100 kg, the operator would connect the buoys to the test sample by using manipulator first, and then release the buoy. Once the buoy reached the surface, it would be recovered by the mother ship, and the salvage cable connected to the buoys would be connected to the retrieving system on board the mother ship to recover the test sample. Once the test sample is secured on board the mother ship, the submersibles would be recalled and retrieved, thus concluding the salvage operation. Built by the same manufacturer that built the Type 7103 DSRV for PLAN, the famed Wuchang Shipbuilding Factory (武昌造船厂, later reorganized to Wuhan Shipbuilding Industry Corporation, Inc.), Osprey class submersibles can be carried by a various platforms, such as Type 925 Dajiang class naval auxiliary ships.

== Osprey 1 ==
Osprey 1 performed well beyond the original expectation in that it has surpassed all design standards. During the trial in May 1988, it has successfully salvaged a BL-1 (BL = Ba Lei, 靶雷) training torpedo at the depth of 145 meters. In November of the same year, Osprey 1 successfully salvaged a Yu-4B torpedo used for evaluation from the depth of 143 meters. Both tasks were completed near the maximum working depth, and the submersible entered service in 1989. In addition to support naval weaponry tests, Osprey 1 was also used extensively used in underwater archeology, when its existence was revealed for the very first time when Chinese television broadcast the footage of such archeological activities in 2001. However, with the exception of brief appearance in the news footage, nothing else was released and Osprey 1 remained a mystery in the eyes of military enthusiasts, and it was not until half a decade later in 2006 when the details finally emerged, when the deputy general designer gave an interview to Chinese magazine Naval & Merchant Ships, providing a more detailed info. Osprey 1 had won several awards, including a 1st place in the National Scientific and Technological Advance Award, and a 1st place in the CSIC Scientific and Technological Advance Award.

== Osprey 2 ==
In the 1990s, Osprey 2 was built and subsequently entered service. Improvements reportedly included digitization / computerization, adaptation of a more advanced domestic sonar (rumored to be developed with help of reverse engineering similar western systems), and the increased capability of manipulators. In addition to the original purpose of supporting naval weaponry tests, Osprey 2 is far more capable than Osprey 1 in that it could perform a much wider range of tasks, and in fact, though Osprey 2 is deployed as frequently as its predecessor, a significant portion of the missions are other than purely supporting the underwater weaponry tests. The designers therefore do not consider Osprey 2 as a sister ship of Osprey 1, but instead, a development of a different class. In comparison to other Chinese submersibles such as Type 7103 DSRVs, the maintainability and availability of Osprey class submersible are much higher and the deployment of every boat of this class is much higher boats of other classes.

== Specifications ==
The following specification applies to Osprey 1, though the spec for Osprey 2 is rumored to be similar

- Length: 7.3 meter
- Width: 2.7 meter
- Height: 3.35 meter
- Displacement: 14.18 ton
- Diameter of the pressure hull: 1.80 meter
- Maximum speed: 2 kt
- Range: 8 nm @ 2 kt
- Endurance: 72 hours
- Crew: 3
- Maximum working depth: 160 meter
- Maximum diving depth: 200 meter
