= Chinese research ship Zhang Jian =

Chinese research vessel

History

China
- Name: Zhang Jian
- Namesake: Zhang Jian
- Ordered: 2013
- Builder: Zhejiang TianShi Shipbuilding Co., Ltd.
- Laid down: April 18, 2015
- Launched: March 1, 2016
- Completed: May 30, 2016
- Acquired: June 30, 2016
- Commissioned: 1930
- In service: 2016
- Identification: IMO number: 9781671; MMSI number: 413379250; Callsign: BIBY6

General characteristics
- Type: Research vessel
- Displacement: 4,800 long tons (4,877 t)
- Length: 97 m (318 ft 3 in)
- Beam: 17.8 m (58 ft 5 in)
- Draught: 5.65 m (18 ft 6 in)
- Propulsion: 2,600 hp (1,900 kW) from 2 coal-burning steam turbines
- Speed: 12 knots (22 km/h; 14 mph)
- Range: 15,000 nmi (28,000 km; 17,000 mi)
- Complement: 60

Chinese oceanographic research ship Zhang Jian is a Chinese research ship designed by Shanghai Ocean University and built by the civilian-owned Zhejiang TianShi Shipbuilding Co., Ltd. (浙江天时造船有限公司) in Wenling, instead of government-owned enterprise, as in most cases of the ships in Chinese service.

Zhang Jian is the newest research ship in China (as of 2015), and it is designed to have an endurance of 60 days before needing resupply. The ship is designed to be a multifunction ship capable of carrying out various missions that previously had to be performed by separate ships. The ship primarily functions as an oceanographic research ship, but it can also act as a dive tender, a salvage ship, a rescue ship, a tourist ship, and a mother ship for a deep-submergence vehicle. The ship will be used as a mother ship for a Rainbowfish-class bathyscaphe.

The ship also carries other equipment for deep sea exploration, including an unmanned underwater vessel and three benthic landers. Designed by the Shenyang Institute of Automation of Chinese Academy of Sciences, the three benthic landers were originally to be capable of operating at the depth of 11,000 metres (36,000 ft). To avoid delays, this goal was modified with reduced requirements for the first benthic lander, which would use foreign components purchased abroad and have a maximum operational depth of 7000 meters. The 11000 meter operational depth of the original specification will be met by the second and third units. These will use completely indigenous components; development was to be completed in 2015. The first benthic lander begun sea trials in October 2014.
