= Chinese submarine tender Mount Tai =

Chinese submarine tender

Class overview
- Builders: Hudong Shipyard
- Operators: People's Liberation Army Navy
- In commission: 1964
- Planned: 1
- Building: 1
- Completed: 1
- Active: 0
- Retired: 1
- Scrapped: 1

General characteristics
- Type: Submarine tender
- Displacement: 3,800 long tons (3,900 t)
- Length: 100 m (330 ft)
- Beam: 14.5 m (48 ft)
- Draught: 4.5 m (15 ft)
- Propulsion: 2,000 hp (1,500 kW)
- Speed: 13.2 knots (15.2 mph; 24.4 km/h)
- Complement: 148 + 430+
- Sensors & processing systems: navigational radar and sonar
- Armament: 2 Type 61 twin 37 mm guns (II x 2); 2 Type 61 25 mm guns (II x 2)

Chinese submarine tender Mount Tai was the first submarine tender of the People's Liberation Army Navy (PLAN), and during most of its service life, it was the largest PLANS ship.

== History ==
Its origin was as the cargo ship Peace No. 69 (和平69号) built by Hudong Shipyard in the era of the Great Leap Forward. PLAN tasked that shipyard to convert it to a submarine tender.

Its maiden voyage came on August 1, 1964. The ship formally entered service at the end of the year after five months trials. The original crew mostly consisted of sailors from retired PLANS Yan'an, the ex-ROCS Yong Ji (永绩), a Yongfeng-class gunboat (PLANS Yan’an was sunk on June 19, 1965 as a target during AShM test).

The ship remained in the 22nd submarine squadron for its service life. The pennant number of PLANS Mt Tai originally was 329, but after October 1974, it was changed to 920. After nearly a quarter of century service, the ship was succeeded by Type 925 submarine support ship and retired from PLAN in April 1988. Thereafter, the ship was converted to its original cargo ship version, and moved to civilian shipping, a task it performed for more than a decade. It was scrapped in late 1990s.

== Design ==
It was powered by a domestic 2000 horsepower 42/80 diesel engine with 500 rpm. The ship could reach a top speed of 13 kt, and cruise at 8 kt. To provide electricity power to submarines, 5 generators, (2 were West German built capable of generating 500 kW each), while the remaining 3 were domestic generators capable of generating 100 kW each.

Armaments included two pairs of Type 61 twin 37 mm naval guns and two pairs of Type 61 twin 25 mm guns. The onboard torpedo maintenance/repair facility could store 24 torpedoes.

Onboard electronic gear included navigational radar, sonar, depth sounder, range finder, Type 105 underwater communication system, electronic and magnetic compasses. The ship was equipped with more than a dozen wireless phones and various communication radio systems, which enable it to act as a command ship in addition to submarine support. Furthermore, this ship also acted as target ship for submarines and as a water tanker.

In addition to the 148 crew, PLANS Mount Tai had more than 430 additional beds/bunks, capable of housing two submarine crews simultaneously. The ship is equipped with onboard hospital, with surgery and X-ray, in order to rotate crew at sea.

Pennant #	Name (English)	Name (Han 中文)	Displacement (t)	Commissioned	Status
920	Mount Tai	泰山	3800	1964	Retired
