= Explorer AUV =

Autonomous underwater vehicle from People's Republic of China

Explorer (Tan Suo Zhe, 探索者) autonomous underwater vehicle (AUV) is a Chinese AUV developed in the People's Republic of China (PRC), first entering service in November 1994. It should not be confused with another two Anglo-American AUVs that share the same name: the American Autonomous Benthic Explorer AUV (ABE) built by Woods Hole Oceanographic Institution, and the British Columbia-based International Submarine Engineering built Canadian Explorer AUV, which is based on its earlier ARCS AUV. Many Chinese AUVs later developed, such as Wukong, WZODA, CR series, Exploration series, Micro Dragon series, Sea Whale series, Submerged Dragon series AUVs, are all based on experienced gained from Explorer AUV.

== Explorer AUV ==
Explorer AUV is one of the projects of 863-512 subprogram of the 863 Program in PRC, developed by a joint team of research and educational establishments including the 702nd Research Institute (中国船舶重工集团公司第702研究所) of China Shipbuilding Industry Corporation (CSIC), Shenyang Institute of Automation (沈阳自动化所) of Chinese Academy of Sciences (CAS), Shipbuilding Engineering Institute (船舶工程学院) of Harbin Engineering University (HEU), Institute of Underwater Engineering (水下工程研究所) of Shanghai Jiao Tong University (SHJTU), and other establishments totaling over a dozen. Feng Xisheng (封锡盛), a professor of Shipbuilding Engineering Institute of HEU was named at the general designer of Explorer AUV, while Xu Huangnan (徐芑南), a professor of School of Naval Architecture, Ocean and Civil Engineering (船舶与海洋工程学院) of SHJTU and the general designer of 8A4 class ROUVs, was named as the deputy general designer of Explorer AUV. Explorer AUV is the first AUV of PRC.

The brain of Explorer AUV consists of three computers: central control computer, positioning computer, and imagery computer. In addition to controlling the interface tracing the traveling path and the interface controlling the surveillance of the system, the central control computer controls the interface controlling remotely operated module so that in addition to being able to operate as an AUV, the Explorer AUV can also be operated as a remotely operated underwater vehicle (ROUV). To accurately provide the positional parameters of the Explore AUV in the water such as pitch, row, yaw, depth, distance and location, the navigational system of the Explorer AUV utilizes a number of methodologies, including GPS, Doppler Velocity Measurement, directional gyro, short baseline positioning, ultra short baseline positioning, visual tracking and fluxgate compass. Information provided by these subsystems are fed and processed by the navigational computer on board. The compressed underwater television images are handled by the imagery computer. These on board electronics are powered by the main propulsion system consisted of lead-acid batteries with 120 V direct current, which is converted to 220 V alternate current to power the electronic equipment.

The communication system of Explorer AUV consists of surface communication subsystem and underwater communication subsystem, and the two are linked via acoustic communication module, which passed the information received from underwater communication computer and pass it on the central computer. The central control computer analyzes this information, including sending the compressed television imagery signals to imagery computer, which in turn, convert the information to display the image on the screen. The communication between the central control computer and positioning computer is achieved via RS-232 interface, while GPS information is received from the positioning computer via EIA-422 interface. In addition to sending the information to control the AUV, the central computer is also designed to communicate and interface the operating console on the mother ship when needed. The underwater communication system of Explorer AUV consists of two major components, the sonar controlling module and communication computer (via CPU). The sonar controlling module is tasked to control acoustic communication module, Doppler sonar, side-looking sonar, and other sonars, while communication computer is tasked to act as an interface between various onboard subsystems.

The sonar control module is also tasked to process the imagery data, compress the data, and communicate with the communication computer. Numerous sensors were installed on board Explorer AUV to provide the necessary information for the AUV to operate, and these environmental subsystems consisted of underwater cameras and sonar. Information gathered is recorded on board the AUV while is also passed to the operator console on the mother ship at the same time, and the camera is capable of store 250 high resolution photos. The information gathered for navigation is also used to control the AUV, and extensive built-in diagnostic system can automatically fix minor problems, and alert the mother ship of major mishaps that cannot be fixed automatically, while directing the AUV to ascend to surface at the same time. The success of Explorer AUV provides the foundation for Chinese cooperation with Russia to jointly develop the next Chinese AUV, the WZODA AUV.

=== Specifications ===
- Length: 4.4 meters (14 ft)
- Width: 0.8 meters
- Height: 1.5 meters
- Weight: 2.2 tons
- Speed: > 4 kt
- Side-traveling speed: > 1 kt
- Diving speed: > 0.5 kt
- Maximum operating depth: 1 km
- Propulsion: Electrically powered propellers
- Power: lead–acid batteries

== WZODA AUV ==
Just like its predecessor Explorer AUV, WZODA AUV is part of the 863 Program, and it is jointly developed by Russia and several Chinese establishments including 702nd Research Institute (702nd Institute) and Shenyang Institute of Automation (SIoA), the developers of Explorer AUV. The general design follows that of earlier Explorer AUV, with many design changes to achieve the new depth requirement, which is 6000 meter. New technologies and design features adopted by 702nd Institute and agreed by Russian partners included the contra-rotating tunnel thrusters, which provides advantage for the AUV to climb underwater slopes. After a single unit was completed, the joint Sino-Russo team moved on the next design, CR-01 AUV.

== CR-01 AUV ==
CR-01 AUV is the successor of WZODA AUV, which is also developed by the same developers, the joint Sino-Russo team that included the Chinese 702nd Institute and SIoA. CR-01 can dive to the same depth of its predecessor WZODA AUV, but with better positioning accuracy, thanks to GPS assisted navigation system incorporated. CR-01 has multiple microprocessors and reprogrammable, and in addition to be autonomous, it can also be remotely piloted via an eight-channel data link. The black box of CR-01 is based on that of aircraft, and in emergency situations such as loss of control, CR-01 would automatically surface and release markers, light and radio signals for easy salvage. Specifications:

- Length: 4.374 m
- Width: 0.8 m
- Draft: 0.93 m
- Weight: 1305.15 kg
- Maximum depth: 6000 m
- Maximum speed: 2 kt
- Endurance: 10 hr
- Positioning accuracy: 10 to 15 m

== CR-01A AUV ==
CR-01A AUV is the development of CR-01 AUV. After successful deployments, it was recommended that CR-01 should be modified to solve the shortcomings exposed during its usage. After extensive refit that lasted more than one and half a year, it re-entered service as CR-01A. The external dimensions are general similar to that of its predecessor CR-01, but CR-02 can also perform salvage functions, with detection ability to penetrate mud layer up to 50 meters thick. Due to the success of CR-01 series AUV, its general designer Feng Xisheng (封锡盛, December 17, 1941—) was promoted to academician of Chinese Academy of Sciences in 1999.

== CR-02 AUV ==
CR-02 is the development of CR-01A, and it has been deployed in oceanic mineral survey. In addition to the survey sonar, a total of eight miniature obstacle avoidance sonars are installed on CR-02 AUV. Specifications:

- Length: 4.5 m
- Diameter: 0.8 m
- Weight: 1.5 t
- Speed: 2.3 kt
- Endurance: 25 hr
- Depth: 6000 m
- Power: silver-zinc battery
- Photographic capability: 3000 photos
- Recording capability: over 4 hours continuously
- Obstacle avoidance sonar range: 60 m
- Obstacle avoidance sonar accuracy: 1%
- Survey sonar range: 12 km
- Survey sonar accuracy: better than 20 m
- Bottom penetration: 50 m (soft mud)

== Sea Clever AUV ==
Based on experienced gained from Explorer AUV, HEU has developed a very little known Sea Clever (Hai-Ling, 海灵) AUV. Sea Clever is developed as a 300-kg class AUV that is designed mainly to develop various critical components of AUVs that are embargoed by foreign countries, so China had to indigenously develop these parts on its own. The successful development of Sea Clever helped future domestic Chinese AUVs to reduce reliance on foreign components. Specification:

- Weight: 300 kg

== Sea Whale 1000 AUV ==
Sea Whale (Hai-Jing, 海鲸) 1000 AUV is a long-endurance AUV, and is jointly developed by SIA, Ocean University of China, Shanghai Jiao Tong University, Sun Yat-sen University, The Second Institute of the Ministry of Natural Resources of the People's Republic of China, and South China Sea Institute of Oceanography of CAS, with SIA as the development team lead. Sea Whale 1000 AUV adopts modular design to enable it to carry various equipments for different missions, and it entered service at the end of 2020.

== Sea Whale 2000 AUV ==
Sea Whale 2000 AUV is a development of earlier Sea Whale 1000 AUV, with the same development team, and like its predecessor Sea Whale 1000, Sea Whale 2000 is also capable of performing various scientific research and survey missions. Specification:

- Weight: 200 kg
- Speed: 2 kt
- Range: > 2000 km
- Endurance: > 1 month
- Operating depth: 1500 to 2000 meter

== Micro Dragon series AUVs ==
Micro Dragon (Wei-Long, 微龙) series AUV is a series of experimental AUVs developed from experience gained from Explorer AUV by HEU, and they are primarily developed to research the topic of miniaturization of AUVs, so that future AUVs can either be drastically shrink in size so they can operate in confined space underwater, or when future AUVs are built to the same size, the miniaturization of components on board would leave more room either for more batteries to enable the AUV to have longer range, or more room to house additional payload. A total of two models of Micro Dragon series AUVs have been developed: Micro Dragon 1 (WL-I), Micro Dragon 2 (WL-II), and Micro Dragon 3 (WL-III).

== Wukong AUV ==
Wukong (悟空, meaning Goku) AUV is an UUV developed by HEU based on experience gained on earlier Explorer series AUVs. Wukong AUV is designed to operate to a depth of more than 10,000 meters, and it has been successfully deployed in Chinese scientific research missions on Mariana Trench, reach a depth of 10,896 meter. The general designer is Mr. Li Yejiao (李晔教) and the deputy general designer is Mr. Cao Jian (曹建) and Mr. Li Yueming (李岳明), all of them are professors of HEU. Specification:

- Length: 2 meter
- Width: 1 meter
- Weight: 1.3 ton
- Maximum operating depth: > 10,000 meter
