= Underwater vehicle =

Vehicle intended to operate underwater

An underwater vehicle is a class of watercraft intended to operate in the underwater environment, including crewed submersibles and unmanned systems such as remotely operated vehicles (ROVs) and autonomous underwater vehicles (AUVs).

This article lists the types of underwater vehicle, with a brief description of each type. An underwater vehicle can be crewed or unmanned (which may be remotely operated or fully autonomous), and will generally, but not necessarily, have some form of onboard propulsion system.

== Types ==
- Autonomous underwater vehicle (AUV) – Uncrewed underwater vehicle with autonomous guidance system
- Benthic lander – Platform for measurements on the seabed
- Diver propulsion vehicle (DPV) – Powered device for diver mobility and range extension
- Diver sled – Unpowered steerable creboards towed by a surface boat (towed underwater vehicle)
- Diving bell – Chamber for transporting divers vertically through the water
- Diving stage – Platform on which a diver is transported vertically through the water
- Remotely operated underwater vehicle (ROUV) – Tethered underwater mobile device operated by a remote crew
- Submarine – Watercraft capable of independent underwater operation
- Submersible – Small watercraft able to navigate under water
- Underwater glider – Type of autonomous underwater vehicle
- Submersible barge (towed underwater vehicle)
