= Watercraft =

Water-borne conveyance

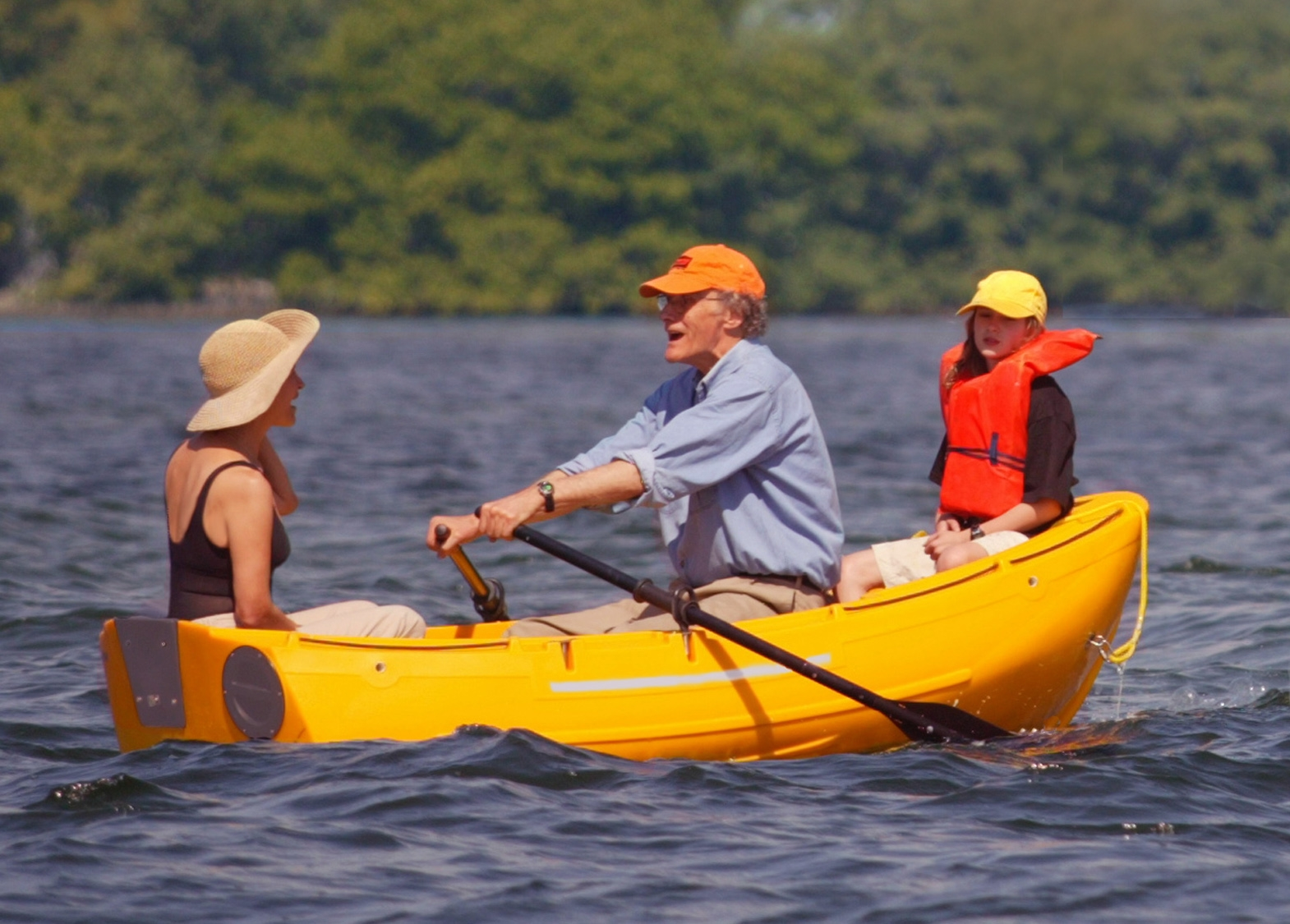
A dinghy

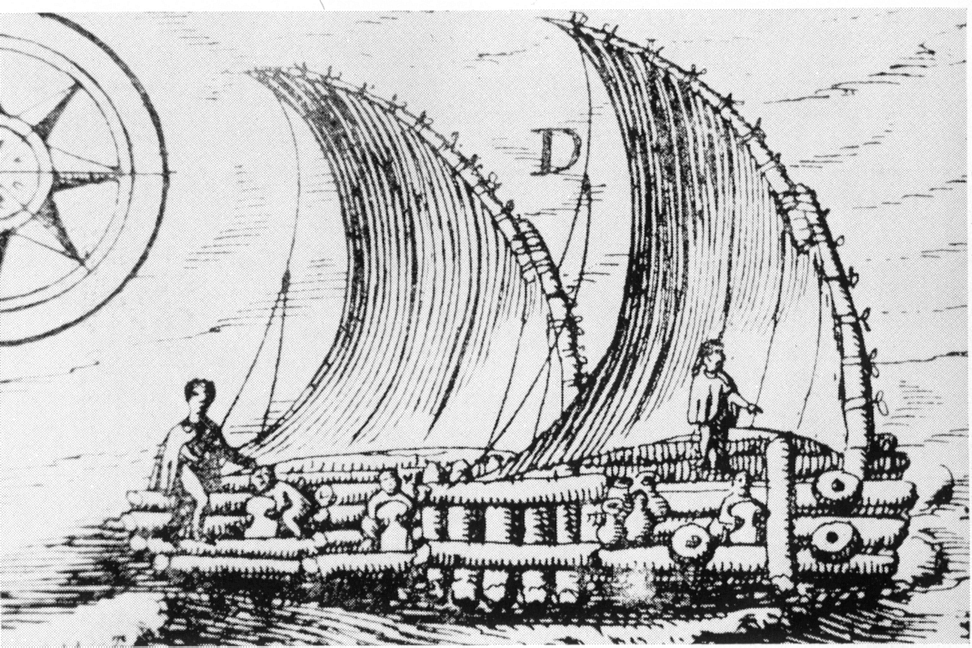
A 17th-century sailing raft in Paita harbour (Peru).

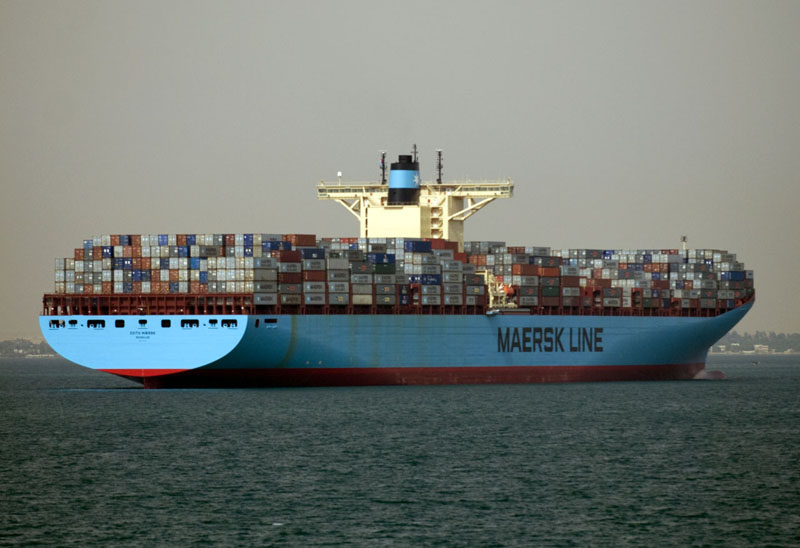
A container ship in the Suez Canal

A watercraft or waterborne vessel is any vehicle designed for travel across or through water bodies, such as a boat, ship, hovercraft, submersible or submarine.

== Types ==
Historically, watercraft have been divided into two main categories.

- Rafts, which gain their buoyancy from the fastening together of components that are each buoyant in their own right. Generally, a raft is a "flow through" structure, whose users would have difficulty keeping dry as it passes through waves. Consequently, apart from short journeys (such as a river crossing), their use is confined to warmer regions (roughly 40° N to 40° S). Outside this area, use of rafts at sea is impracticable due to the risks of exposure to the crew.
- Boats and ships, which float by having the submergible part of their structure exclude water with a waterproof surface, so creating a space that contains air, as well as cargo, passengers, crew, etc. In total, this structure weighs less than the water that would occupy the same volume.

Watercraft can be grouped into surface vessels, which include ships, yachts, boats, hydroplanes, wingships, unmanned surface vehicles, sailboards and human-powered craft such as rafts, canoes, kayaks and paddleboards; underwater vessels, which include submarines, submersibles, unmanned underwater vehicles (UUVs), wet subs and diver propulsion vehicles; and amphibious vehicles, which include hovercraft, car boats, amphibious ATVs and seaplanes. Many of these watercraft have a variety of subcategories and are used for different needs and applications.

== Design ==
The design of watercraft requires a tradeoff among internal capacity (tonnage), speed and seaworthiness. Tonnage is important for transport of goods, speed is important for warships and racing vessels, and the degree of seaworthiness varies according to the bodies of water on which a watercraft is used. Regulations apply to larger watercraft, to avoid foundering at sea and other problems. Design technologies include the use of computer modeling and ship model basin testing before construction.

== Propulsion ==
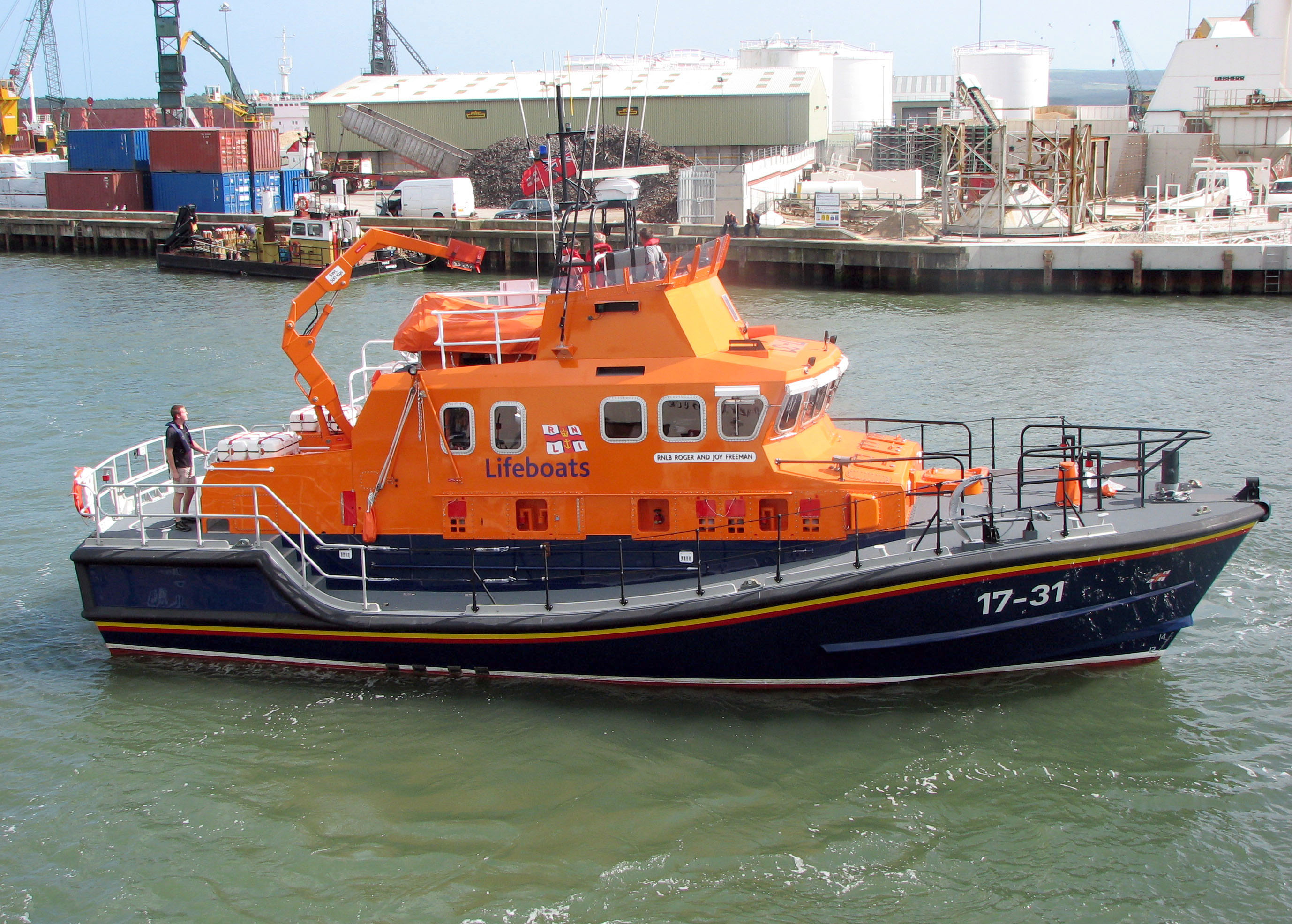
A Severn-class lifeboat in Poole Harbour, Dorset, England.

Watercraft propulsion can be divided into five categories.

- Water power is used by drifting with a river current or a tidal stream. An anchor or weight may be lowered to provide enough steerage way to keep in the best part of the current (as in drudging) or paddles or poles might be used to keep position.
- Human effort is used through a pole pushing against the bottom of shallow water, or paddles or oars operating in the surface of the water.
- Wind power is used by sails
- Towing is used, either from the land, such as the bank of a canal, with the motive power provided by draught animals, humans or machinery, or one watercraft may tow another.
- Mechanical propulsion uses a motor whose power is derived from burning a fuel or stored energy such as batteries. This power is commonly converted into propulsion by propellers or water jets, with paddle wheels being a largely historical method.

Any one watercraft might use more than one of these methods at different times or in conjunction with each other. For instance, early steamships often set sails to work alongside the engine power. Before steam tugs became common, sailing vessels would back and fill their sails to maintain a good position in a tidal stream while drifting with the tide in or out of a river. In a modern yacht, motor-sailing – travelling under the power of both sails and engine – is a common method of making progress, if only in and out of harbour.

== See also ==
- Glossary of nautical terms (disambiguation)
- Maritime history
- Ship transport
- Waterway
- French frigate Brillant (1757)
