= Xin Pu Yang =

Chinese oil tanker

History

China
- Name: Xin Pu Yang
- Owner: China COSCO Shipping
- Builder: China Shipbuilding Industry Corporation
- Laid down: 8 September 2008
- Launched: 19 June 2009
- Completed: 7 January 2010
- In service: January 2010
- Identification: IMO number: 9416628

Xin Pu Yang (Chinese: 新埔洋) is an oil tanker designed and built by the China Shipbuilding Industry Corporation. She was laid down on 8 September 2008, launched on 19 June 2009 and completed on 7 January 2010. With a deadweight tonnage of 309,362 tons and a gross tonnage of 161,488 she was at the time of her completion the largest tanker built in China. She is 333 meters long and 60 meters wide.

The ship is owned and operated by COSCO Shipping Tanker (Shanghai) Co Ltd, a subsidiary of China COSCO Shipping.
