= Sea Dragon-class ROV =

Chinese deep diving work class remotely operated underwater vehicle

Sea Dragon-class remotely operated underwater vehicles (ROUVs) are a class of Chinese remotely operated vehicle (ROV) used to perform various underwater tasks such as oil platform service, salvage, and rescue missions. Following the successful development of the original Sea Dragon (海龙), a series of ROUVs based on it have been developed. The original model had a diving capability up to 3,500 meters, but subsequent models were designed to meet a variety of operating conditions.

The Sea Dragon series ROUVs were foundational in the domestic development of ROUVs in China. Numerous ROUVs were subsequently developed directly based on experience gained from the Sea Dragon series.

== Background ==
Although numerous types of ROUVs were developed in China in the 1980s and 1990s, they were limited by maximum operating depths of less than 1,000 meters, which is not enough for tasks like deepwater exploration and repairs. The Sea Dragon-class ROUV was developed to meet this urgent need for ROUVs capable of deepwater operations. China developed the ROUV independently, since it was too costly to obtain foreign assistance on the international market.

Funding for the development of the Sea Dragon-class ROUV was provided by COMRA (中国大洋协会) (China Ocean Mineral Resource Research and Development Association, 中国大洋矿产资源研究开发协会). The Institute of Underwater Engineering (水下工程研究所) of Shanghai Jiao Tong University (SHJTU) was named as the contractor. Ren Ping (任平), a professor at School of Naval Architecture, Ocean and Civil Engineering of SHJTU served as general designer. Other important design team members included Zhu Jimao (朱继懋), another SHJTU professor, who was the general designer of earlier Type 7103 DSRV and the general designer of earlier HR-01 ROUV.

== Sea Dragon-1 ROUV ==
Sea Dragon-1 (usually simply referred as Sea Dragon) ROUV began its final sea trials on 29 July 2004, and subsequently entered Chinese service in the same year (production index: JTR-41). However, it was not until 2011, more than half a decade later, that it finally became fully capable of operating regularly at the maximum depth it was originally designed for. Since then, Sea Dragon has successfully performed numerous missions.

It is equipped with half a dozen underwater cameras, one of which is specifically for stationary objects, and half a dozen underwater lights for illumination. Additionally, there are two high-intensity discharge lamps for additional illumination, and sonar for additional search capability. A 100-horsepower propulsion system powers four thrusters for horizontal movement and two thrusters for vertical movement. There are two manipulators—one with 7 degrees of freedom (DOF) and another with 5 DOF—capable of handling several hundred kilograms of weight, and able to perform a variety of tasks underwater.

The tether management system weighs 2.5 tons, while the cable spool with steel cables weighs over 40 tons. To avoid the loss of the ROUV in bad weather, as in the case of Kaikō in 2003, a specially designed mechanism was incorporated to prevent such mishaps.

Specifications:

- Length: 3.17 meters
- Width: 1.81 meters
- Height: 2.24 meters
- Weight: 3.45 tons
- Operating depth: 3,500 meters
- Payload: 250 kg
- Speed: 3.3 kt
- Propulsion: 100 SHP

== Sea Dragon-2 ROUV ==
Sea Dragon-2 (also stylized as Sea Dragon II) is the successor of Sea Dragon, developed by the same designer and also funded by COMRA. Performance analysis of Sea Dragon led to design improvements seen in Sea Dragon-2 ROUV. From 29 April to 17 May 2008, Sea Dragon-2 ROUV successfully completed its final sea trials in the South China Sea under the leadership and supervision of Professor Zhu Jimao, and subsequently entered Chinese service; however, similar to its predecessor, Sea Dragon-2 did not become fully capable of regularly operating at its maximum depth until 2011.

Sea Dragon-2's most obvious improvement is its speed of descent. Sea Dragon-2 is almost twice as fast as Sea Dragon-1 in reaching the maximum operating depth of 3,500 meters (30 minutes, as compared to 50 minutes for Sea Dragon-1). Reliability, maintainability, and availability are also improved for Sea Dragon-2.

Despite these improvements, the size and weight of Sea Dragon-2 are almost identical to that of Sea Dragon-1 due to its more advanced technologies. Other physical characteristics and performance parameters remain the same as that of Sea Dragon-1. Since its completion, Sea Dragon-2 has also successfully completed many missions.

Specifications:

- Length: 3.8 meters
- Width: 1.8 meters
- Height: 1.8 meters
- Weight: 3.45 ton
- Operating depth: 3,500 meters
- Payload: 250 kg
- Propulsion: 125 SHP

== Sea Dragon 3 ==
Sea Dragon 3 (also stylized as Sea Dragon III) is a development of the earlier Sea Dragon-2, and its general designer is SHJTU professor Ge Tong (葛彤). Its maximum operating depth of 6,000 meters is nearly double its predecessor's (3,500 meters), and its payload also increased by 40% to 350 kg.

Specifications:

- Operating depth: 6,000 meters
- Payload: 350 kg
- Propulsion: 170 SHP

== Sea Dragon 4E ==
Sea Dragon 4E is designed mainly for underwater engineering tasks, such as surveillance, inspection, cleaning, cutting, welding, and construction work of oil platforms and hydraulic projects.

== Sea Dragon 11000 ==
Sea Dragon 11000 is an ROUV that is capable of operating at a depth of 11,000 meters. As with earlier models in the Sea Dragon series, the maximum diving depth was not achieved on the first attempt. Instead, the diving depth was gradually increased with each dive attempt; significant milestones include reaching a depth of 410 meters on its first dive on 30 March 2018, reaching 2,000 meters in April 2018, reaching 6,000 meters in September 2018, and finally reaching its planned diving depth of 11,000 meters in 2021.

Specifications:

- Maximum operating depth: 11,000 meters

== JTML-02 ==
JTML-02 is an ROUV designed for digging tasks on the seabed as part of construction work when laying underwater power and communication cables.

Specifications:

- Length: 1 meter
- Width: 5.4 meters
- Height: 2 meters
- Digging depth: 2.5 meters
- Operating depth: 50 meters
- Maximum diameter of cable allowed: 0.16 meters

== JTMP-03 ==
JTMP-03 is an ROUV designed for digging tasks on the seabed as part of construction work when laying underwater cables and pipelines.

Specifications:

- Length: 9 meters
- Width: 5 meters
- Height: 3.355 meters
- Digging depth when laying cables: 2 meters
- Digging depth when laying pipes: 3 meters
- Operating depth: 100 meters
- Maximum diameter of cable allowed: 0.16 meters
- Maximum diameter of pipe allowed: 0.8 meters

== JTMP-04 Walrus ==
JTMP-04 Walrus (Chinese: 海象; pinyin: Hai-Xiang) is an ROUV designed for digging tasks on the seabed as part of construction work when laying underwater cables and pipelines.

Specifications:

- Length: 11 meters
- Width: 10 meters
- Height: 5.5 meters
- Digging depth: 4 meters
- Operating depth: 100 meters
- Maximum diameter of cable and pipe allowed: 1.5 meters

== JTR-11 ==
JTR-11 is a lightweight underwater ROUV designed for observation missions. It is equipped with LED lights and a CCD camera.

Specifications:

- Length: 0.65 meters
- Width: 0.45 meters
- Height: 0.3 meters
- Weight: 22 kg
- Operating depth: 100 meters
- Speed: 0.5 kt

== JTR-21 ==
JTR-21 is designed for underwater inspection and search missions. It is equipped with LED lights, 2 CCD cameras, and Canadian Imagenex Model 881 digital multi-frequency imaging sonar.

Specifications:

- Length: 1 meter
- Width: 0.56 meters
- Height: 0.5 meters
- Weight: 60 kg
- Operating depth: 200 meters
- Payload: 10 kg
- Speed: 3.3 kt

== JTR-31 ==
JTR-31 is designed for use in underwater construction. It is equipped with 2 manipulators, LED lights, 2 CCD cameras, and Canadian Imagenex Model 881 digital multi-frequency imaging sonar.

Specifications:

- Length: 2 meters
- Width: 0.7 meters
- Height: 0.9 meters
- Weight: 200 kg
- Operating depth: 200 meters
- Speed: 3 kt
- Payload: 50 kg

== JTR-F1 ==
JTR-F1 is a lightweight ROUV designed for underwater rescue missions, especially when there is a need to venture inside wreckage.

In addition to a CCD camera and LED lights, JTR-F1 also carries batteries on board, and thus is remotely operated via a much lighter fiber optic cable, without the need of a power cable.

Specifications:

- Length: 1 meter
- Width: 0.4 meters
- Height: 0.3 meters
- Weight: 25 kg
- Operating depth: 100 meters
- Speed: 2 kt
- Endurance: 10 hours

== JTR-H1 ==
JTR-H1 is a lightweight ROUV for underwater observation missions in radioactive environments. It can also be used for inspection inside pipelines. It is equipped with a CCD camera, LED lights, and a manipulator.

Specifications:

- Length: 0.47 meters
- Width: 0.49 meters
- Height: 0.41 meters
- Weight: 31 kg
- Speed: 1 kt
