= Hu Chuanzhi =

Chinese shipbuilding executive and politician (1929–2018)

Hu Chuanzhi (Chinese: 胡传治; December 1929 – 29 September 2018) was a Chinese shipbuilding executive and politician. He was CEO of the China State Shipbuilding Corporation, the state-owned shipbuilding conglomerate, and Vice Chairman of the Shanghai Municipal People's Congress.

== Biography ==
Hu Chuanzhi was born in December 1929 in Wuchang, Hubei, China. He joined the Chinese Communist Party in March 1954.

He spent most of his career in the shipbuilding industry, first as an engineer at Zhonghua Shipyard in Shanghai, where he helped design China's first generation of guided-missile destroyers. He then became deputy head and then head of Jiangnan Shipyard, where he oversaw the construction of the Yuan Wang 1 and Yuan Wang 2 tracking ships. He was later promoted to CEO of the China State Shipbuilding Corporation.

Hu was a member of the 7th National People's Congress, and a delegate to the 13th National Congress of the Chinese Communist Party. He had two terms as Vice Chairman of the 9th and 10th Shanghai Municipal People's Congress (minister-level).

On 29 September 2018, Hu died at Huadong Hospital in Shanghai, aged 88.
