= Type 926 submarine support ship =

Chinese submarine tender and rescue ship

History

PRC
- Commissioned: 2015 onward
- Status: Active

General characteristics
- Class & type: Dalao class
- Type: Submarine support ship
- Displacement: 7,600 long tons (7,700 t)
- Length: 135 m (442 ft 11 in)
- Beam: 18.6 m (61 ft 0 in)
- Propulsion: Integrated electric propulsion
- Sensors & processing systems: Navigation radar
- Electronic warfare & decoys: None
- Armament: None
- Armour: None

Type 926 submarine support ship with NATO reporting name Dalao is a class of submarine rescue and supply ship developed by China for the People's Liberation Army Navy (PLAN), and as of mid-2014, a total of three are in service. This ship is capable of both replenishing submarines and rescuing submariners in distress.

With a displacement of 9500 tons, the Type 926 carries newly designed rescue chambers that are capable of performing rescue missions to a depth of three hundred meters, being able to rescue a maximum of eighteen submariners each dive. One of these ships carries a deep-submergence rescue vehicle (DSRV) imported from the United Kingdom, the LR7, which is a development of the earlier LR5. The LR7 is also capable of rescuing a total of eighteen submariners each dive and the 25-ton DSRV can perform rescue operations at five hundred meters depth and continuously working under water for four days. The rest of the ships carry the successor of the Type 7103 DSRV designed by Harbin Engineering University.

Type	Pennant #	Name	Builder	Launched	Commissioned	Status	Fleet
926	864	Haiyangdao (海洋岛)	―	―	2010	Active	North Sea Fleet
926	865	Liugongdao (刘公岛)	―	2012	―	Active	North Sea Fleet
926	867	Changdao (长岛)	Guangzhou Shipyard International	2012	―	Active	South Sea Fleet

== See also ==
- Type 925 submarine support ship
- Deep Submergence Rescue Vehicle
- Military of the People's Republic of China
