= China State Shipbuilding Corporation =

Largest shipbuilders in China

- Native name: 中国船舶集团有限公司
- Type: State-owned enterprise
- Industry: Shipbuilding, defense
- Founded: May 4, 1982; 44 years ago
- Headquarters: Huangpu District, Shanghai, China
- Area served: Worldwide
- Key people: Zhang Yingdai (Chairman)
- Revenue: US$ 48.9 billion (2023)
- Net income: US$ 2.4 billion (2023)
- Total assets: US$ 143.7 billion (2023)
- Number of employees: 196,309 (2023)
- Website: www.cssc.net.cn

China State Shipbuilding Corporation
- Simplified Chinese: 中国船舶工业总公司
- Traditional Chinese: 中國船舶工業總公司
Transcriptions
Standard Mandarin
- Hanyu Pinyin: Zhōngguó Chuánbó Gōngyè Zǒng Gōngsī

Alternative Chinese name
- Simplified Chinese: 中船总公司
- Traditional Chinese: 中船总公司
Transcriptions
Standard Mandarin
- Hanyu Pinyin: Zhōng Chuán Zǒng Gōngsī

China CSSC Holdings Limited 中国船舶工业股份有限公司
- Type: Subsidiary
- Traded as: CSI A100
- Industry: Shipbuilding
- Founded: 1998
- Headquarters: Shanghai, China
- Area served: Worldwide
- Key people: Dong Qiang (董强) (Chairman)
- Parent: China State Shipbuilding Corporation
- Website: China CSSC Holdings Limited

China State Shipbuilding Corporation Limited
- Simplified Chinese: 中国船舶工业集团有限公司
- Traditional Chinese: 中國船舶工業集團有限公司
Transcriptions
Standard Mandarin
- Hanyu Pinyin: Zhōngguó Chuánbó Gōngyè Jítuán Yǒuxiàn Gōngsī

Alternative Chinese name
- Simplified Chinese: 中船工业
- Traditional Chinese: 中船工業
Transcriptions
Standard Mandarin
- Hanyu Pinyin: Zhōng Chuán Gōngyè

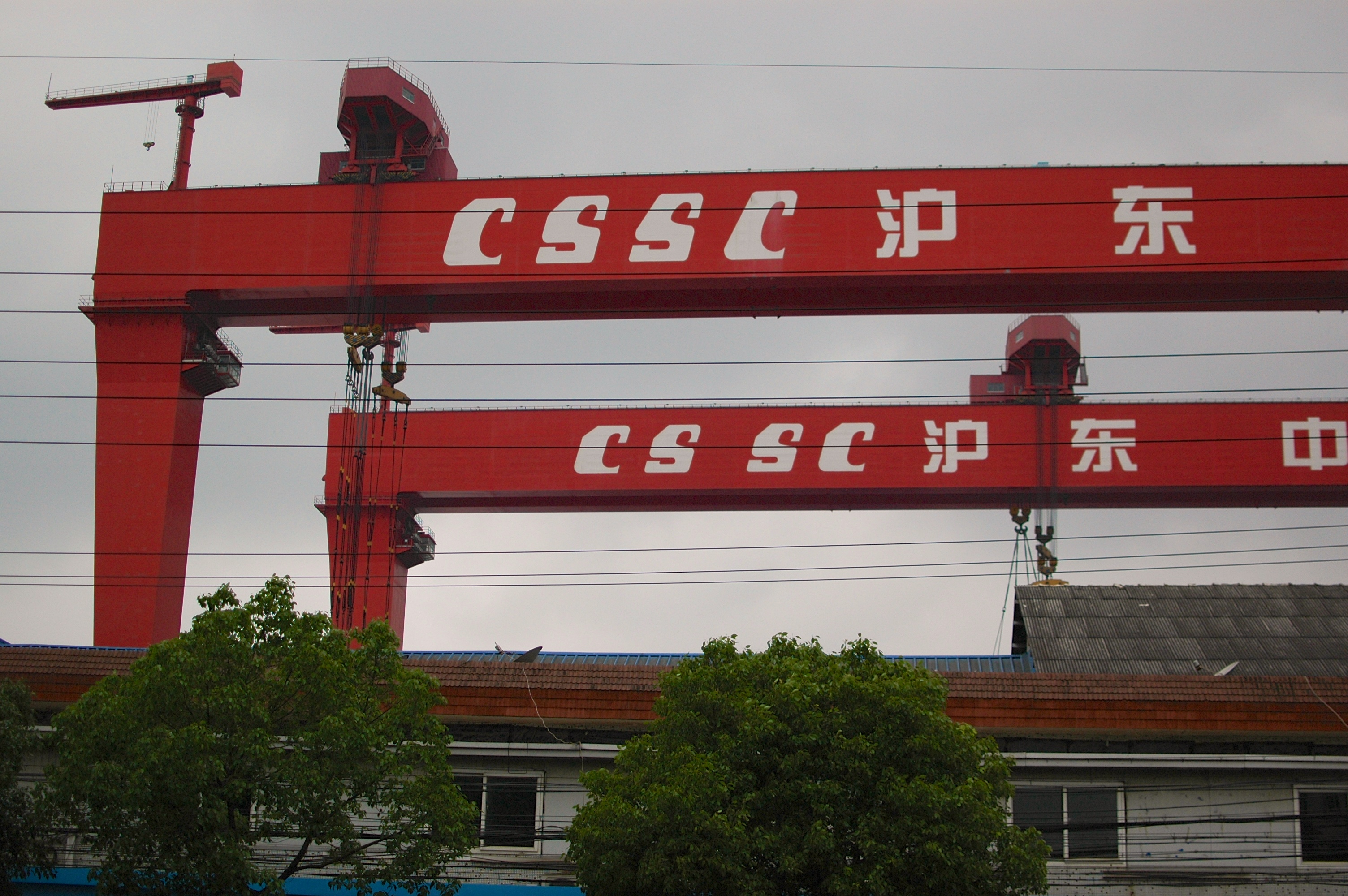
CSSC gantry cranes in June 2012

The China State Shipbuilding Corporation (CSSC) is a state-owned shipbuilding conglomerate of the People's Republic of China (PRC).

== Background ==
CSSC is one of the top 10 defence groups in the PRC. It consists of various shipyards, equipment manufacturers, research institutes and shipbuilding-related companies that build both civilian and military ships. It owns some of the most well known shipbuilders in China, such as Dalian Shipbuilding Industry Company, Jiangnan Shipyard, Hudong–Zhonghua Shipbuilding, Guangzhou Huangpu Shipbuilding and Guangzhou Wenchong Shipyard. Its subsidiary, China CSSC Holdings Limited (SSE: 600150), is listed on the Shanghai Stock Exchange, and in turn owns other subsidiaries including Shanghai Waigaoqiao Shipbuilding. As of 2024, CSSC builds a third of all ships in the world, making it the world's biggest shipbuilding conglomerate. All CSSC ships are built to military specifications, according to Chinese government doctrine.

== History ==
=== Early developments ===
In 1964, the Sixth Ministry of Machine Building was created to oversee China's shipbuilding enterprises, which were predominantly engaged in military work. In July 1982, as part of defence industry reforms and "defence conversions", the ministry was converted into the China State Shipbuilding Corporation. CSSC remained under state control but was permitted to operate with "a degree of market-based economic autonomy". CSSC shifted the industry's focus to commercial work; by 1992, 80% of output was to the civilian sector, and in 1993, half of the commercial output was for export.

=== Spinning off CSIC ===
In the late 1990s, economic reforms broke up state-owned monopolies and introduced "a limited amount of free-market competition" to improve the efficiency of defence industries. In July 1999, the China Shipbuilding Industry Corporation (CSIC) was spun off from CSSC. The shipbuilding industry was divided roughly along geographical lines: CSSC retained assets in the east and south, and CSIC gained control in the northeast and inland. Both reported to the State-owned Assets Supervision and Administration Commission (SASAC). CSSC emerged as the smaller entity. Enterprises not affiliated with either conglomerate included shipyards owned by the People's Liberation Army (PLA), provinces, municipalities, foreign joint ventures, and Chinese shipping companies.

=== Merging with CSIC ===
Preparations for merging CSIC and CSSC date back to at least 2010, when Hu Wenming became CSSC's party secretary, in anticipation of an industry decline. Hu was a strong supporter of the merger; he was CSSC chairman from 2012 to 2015, and then CSIC chairman from March 2015 until his retirement in August 2019 because of corruption. The decision to merge the conglomerates may have influenced not only by a slowing economy, but also the discovery of widespread corruption in CSIC and Hu's involvement in it.

The CSIC and CSSC merger was approved by SASAC in October 2019, and occurred in November 2019; the combined entity took the CSSC name. The reorganization was complete by September 2020. The new entity was the world's largest shipbuilder with 20% global market share and US$110 billion in assets.

In August 2025, CSSC announced it planned to absorb CSIC and take over as the sole listing on the Shanghai Stock Exchange. The two companies accounted for nearly 17% of new orders in 2024 and the merged company had ~$18B in sales.

CSSC and CSIC together account for around 21 percent of global production capacity. With this merger of the two state-controlled shipyards, Xi Jinping's government hopes to achieve efficiency gains and greater resilience to the turmoil in the industry triggered by US President Trump, writes the Wall Street Journal. Trump wants to revive the U.S. shipbuilding industry after decades of decline. In 2024, China's market share was 53 % and the U.S. market share 0.1 %.

=== U.S. sanctions ===
In November 2020, American entities were prohibited by U.S. Presidential Executive Order 13959 from owning shares in companies—including CSSC—linked to the PLA by the United States Department of Defense.

== See also ==
- Hu Chuanzhi, former CEO of the CSSC
- List of largest shipyards
