= Hu Wenming =

Chinese business executive (born 1957)

- 胡问鸣

Chairman of China State Shipbuilding Corporation
- In office July 2012 – August 2019
- General Manager: Sun Bo
- Preceded by: New title
- Succeeded by: Position revoked

Personal details
- Born: May 1957 (age 69) Yangzhou, Jiangsu, China
- Party: Chinese Communist Party (expelled; 1978-2020)
- Education: Nanjing University of Aeronautics and Astronautics

Chinese name
- Traditional Chinese: 胡問鳴
- Simplified Chinese: 胡问鸣
Transcriptions
Standard Mandarin
- Hanyu Pinyin: Hú Wènmíng

Hu Wenming (Chinese: 胡问鸣; pinyin: Hú Wènmíng; born May 1957) is a retired Chinese business executive who served as chairman of China State Shipbuilding Corporation between 2012 and 2019. In May 2020, he was placed under investigation by the Central Commission for Discipline Inspection (CCDI). His subordinate, Sun Bo, was placed under investigation for alleged graft and corruption on June 16, 2018.

== Biography ==
Hu was born in Yangzhou, Jiangsu, in May 1957. In November 1975, he became a sent-down youth in Chi'an Township, Ganjiang County. In March 1978, after the resumption of college entrance examination, he was accepted to Nanjing University of Aeronautics and Astronautics, where he majored in mathematics. After graduating in February 1982, he was assigned to Suzhou Changfeng Machinery Plant, where he successively served as assistant director, deputy director, and director. In July 2001, he was transferred to Beijing and appointed deputy general manager of the China Aviation Industry Corporation I, which was reshuffled as the Aviation Industry Corporation of China in May 2008. He was deputy general manager and Chinese Communist Party Committee Secretary of Norinco in October 2008, and held that office until July 2010. In July 2010, he was appointed deputy general manager and Party branch secretary of China State Shipbuilding Corporation. He became chairman of the board in July 2012, serving in the post until he retirement on August 30, 2019.

He was a member of the 18th Central Commission for Discipline Inspection.

== Investigation ==
On May 12, 2020, he has been placed under investigation for serious violations of laws and regulations by the Central Commission for Discipline Inspection (CCDI), the party's internal disciplinary body, and the National Supervisory Commission, the highest anti-corruption agency of China. Hu's subordinate Sun Bo, former general manager of the China State Shipbuilding Corporation, was placed under investigation by the CCDI in 2018. Sun was eventually sentenced to a 12-year jail term for corruption and abuse of power on July 4, 2019. He was expelled from the Chinese Communist Party on January 4, 2021.

On January 20, 2021, prosecutors signed an arrest order for him.

On December 26, 2023, Hu Wenming was sentenced to 13 years in prison.
