= SJT-class ROUV =

Series of Chinese remotely operated underwater vehicles

SJT-class ROUVs are a series of Chinese remotely operated underwater vehicles (ROUVs) jointly developed by the Shenyang Institute of Automation of the Chinese Academy of Sciences and the Institute of Underwater Engineering of Shanghai Jiao Tong University (SHJTU). The general designer of the SJT-class of ROUVs is Zhu Jimao (朱继懋), a professor at SHJTU, who also was the general designer of the earlier Type 7103 DSRV. Many more ROUVs have been developed after the SJT series, based on experience gained from this series.

== HR-01 ROUV ==
The origin of SJT-class ROUV begins with HR-01 (Chinese: 海人一号; pinyin: Hai-Ren Yi-Hao; lit. 'Sea Person # 1'), one of the first indigenously developed ROUVs. Work began in 1982 and was completed in winter 1985, entering service the following year. In 1989, it won 2nd place in the Science and Technology Advance Award of the Chinese Academy of Science. Based on experience gained from HR-01, the three subsequent SJT-class ROUVs were jointly developed with a Canadian company from 1985 through June 1987.

Specifications:

- Weight: 2.2 tons
- Length: 3.1 meters
- Width: 1.5 meters
- Height: 1.9 meters
- Maximum operating depth: 200 meters

HR-01 is equipped with two lowlight TV cameras, 1 photo camera, 1 manipulator, and four hydraulic-driven propulsors.

== SJT-5 ROUV ==
SJT-5 a 12 kg underwater observation robot with four electric thrusters.

== SJT-10 ROUV ==
SJT-10 ROUV is a light ROUV with a single manipulator, and now is primarily used for underwater works on offshore oil platforms. The secondary application of SJT-10 is salvage. Other applications included similar jobs for underwater structures in inland waterways. The aluminum-framed SJT-10 is equipped with a digitized depth gauge, compass, sonar, lowlight TV camera, and an onboard computer.

== SJT-40 ROUV ==
SJT-40 ROUV is the most capable member of the SJT-class ROUVs and also one of the deepest-diving: up to 400 meters. SJT-40 ROUV has two manipulators and is capable of performing a variety of underwater tasks. Like other SJT-class ROUVs, it is in service with both civilian and military operators, mainly in underwater maintenance work of oil platforms and other structures. Like its smaller cousin SJT-10, the aluminum-framed SJT-40 is also equipped with a digitized depth gauge, digitized compass, sonar, lowlight TV camera, and an onboard computer.

== HR-02 ROUV ==
Based on experience gained from HR-01 development, SHJTU developed the HR-02 ROUV, which is a small ROUV intended to work in confined spaces underwater.

== HR-03 ROUV ==
Similar to its predecessor, HR-03 is also a small ROUV capable of performing additional tasks besides observation, such as sample collection and underwater construction.

== Heavy engineering ROUV ==
Heavy engineering ROUV is a heavy ROUV developed by SHJTU for underwater inspection, maintenance, and construction works up to a depth of 1,500 meters. It is equipped with two manipulators, seven cameras, nine lights, and a sonar.

Specifications:

- Length: 2.23 meters
- Width: 0.9 meters
- Height: 1.21 meters
- Weight: 4.5 tons
- Speed: 3 knots
- Power: 50 HP
- Maximum operating depth: 1,500 meters
- Depth positioning accuracy: ± 0.05 meters
- Directional positioning accuracy: ± 1.2°

== Max electrical ROUV ==
Max electrical ROUV is an electrically powered ROUV developed by SHJTU for underwater inspection, maintenance, and construction works up to a depth of 1,000 meters. It is equipped with two manipulators, five cameras, four to six lights, and up to two sonars, based on customer requests.

Specifications:

- Length: 2.48 meters
- Width: 1.3 meters
- Height: 1.5 meters
- Weight: 0.8 tons
- Payload: 150 kg
- Speed: 2.97 knots
- Power: 65 HP
- Maximum operating depth: 1,000 meters
- Depth positioning accuracy: ± 0.2 meters
- Directional positioning accuracy: ± 1.2°

== Medium engineering ROUV ==
Medium engineering ROUV is a mid-sized ROUV developed by SHJTU for underwater inspection, maintenance, and construction works up to a depth of 500 meters. It is equipped with two manipulators, five cameras, six lights, and a sonar.

Specifications:

- Length: 2.48 meters
- Width: 1.3 meters
- Height: 1.5 meters
- Weight: 1.762 tons
- Payload: 150 kg
- Speed: 2.97 knots
- Power: 65 HP
- Maximum operating depth: 500 meters
- Depth positioning accuracy: ± 0.2 meters
- Directional positioning accuracy: ± 1.2°

== ST-6000 ROUV ==
ST-6000 is an ROUV designed for deep-sea observation missions; it was completed in June 1995. ST-6000 is capable of operating to a depth of 6,000 meters. On 30 September 1995, it reached a depth of 5,200 meters.

== Dragon Emperor ROUV ==
Dragon Emperor (龙皇; Long-Huang) ROUV is a development of the ST-6000 ROUV. Like its predecessor, Dragon Emperor is also used for deep-sea observation. As an experimental ROUV, it is primarily intended for evaluation and validation of subsystems for future ROUVs designed to operate at great depths. In comparison to its predecessor, Dragon Emperor ROUV can operate at much greater depth, with its maximum operating depth increased by two-thirds, to 10,000 meters.

== HR-1-100 ROUV ==
HR-1-100 is a miniature underwater observation vehicle based on the technologies of the much larger HR-01. Since it only performs observation tasks, it is greatly simplified. In addition to a drastic reduction of size and weight, it does not have a manipulator, and the maximum operational depth is reduced by half, to 100 meters. HR-1-100 entered service in 1997.

Specifications:

- Weight: 32 kg
- Maximum operational depth: 100 meters

== JH-01 ROUV ==
Another member of SJT class ROUV is JH-01 (交海; Jiao-Hai; 'Transportation Sea') ROUV, which is specifically designed to meet the urgent need for an ROUV for underwater dam inspection and maintenance. The first customer of the JH-01 was Hai He Hydraulic Works Committee, and its satisfactory performance led to more orders from different customers, including the People's Liberation Army Navy (PLAN), which deployed JH-01 for breakwater inspection and maintenance.

Specifications:

- Weight: 37 kg
- Maximum operating depth: 60 meters

== 8H4 ROUV ==
8H4 ROUV is a development of JH-01, and it is capable of operating at a depth ten times that of JH-01. Equipped with two manipulators, 8H4 ROUV can perform various tasks underwater, such as cutting and welding.

Specifications:

- Maximum operating depth: 600 meters

== JTD-01 Deep Eel I ROUV ==
The JTD-01 "Deep Eel I" is a salvage, drilling, and pipe-laying robot. It has a maximum operating depth of 200 meters. It was first used in December 2012.

== Walrus 1500 ROUV ==
Walrus 1500 ROUV is a ROUV developed by SHJTU for underwater inspection, maintenance, and construction works up to a depth of 1,500 meters. It is equipped with manipulators, cameras, and lights.

Specifications:

- Maximum operating depth: 1,500 meters
