= Bottom crawler =

Vehicle for underwater exploration and work

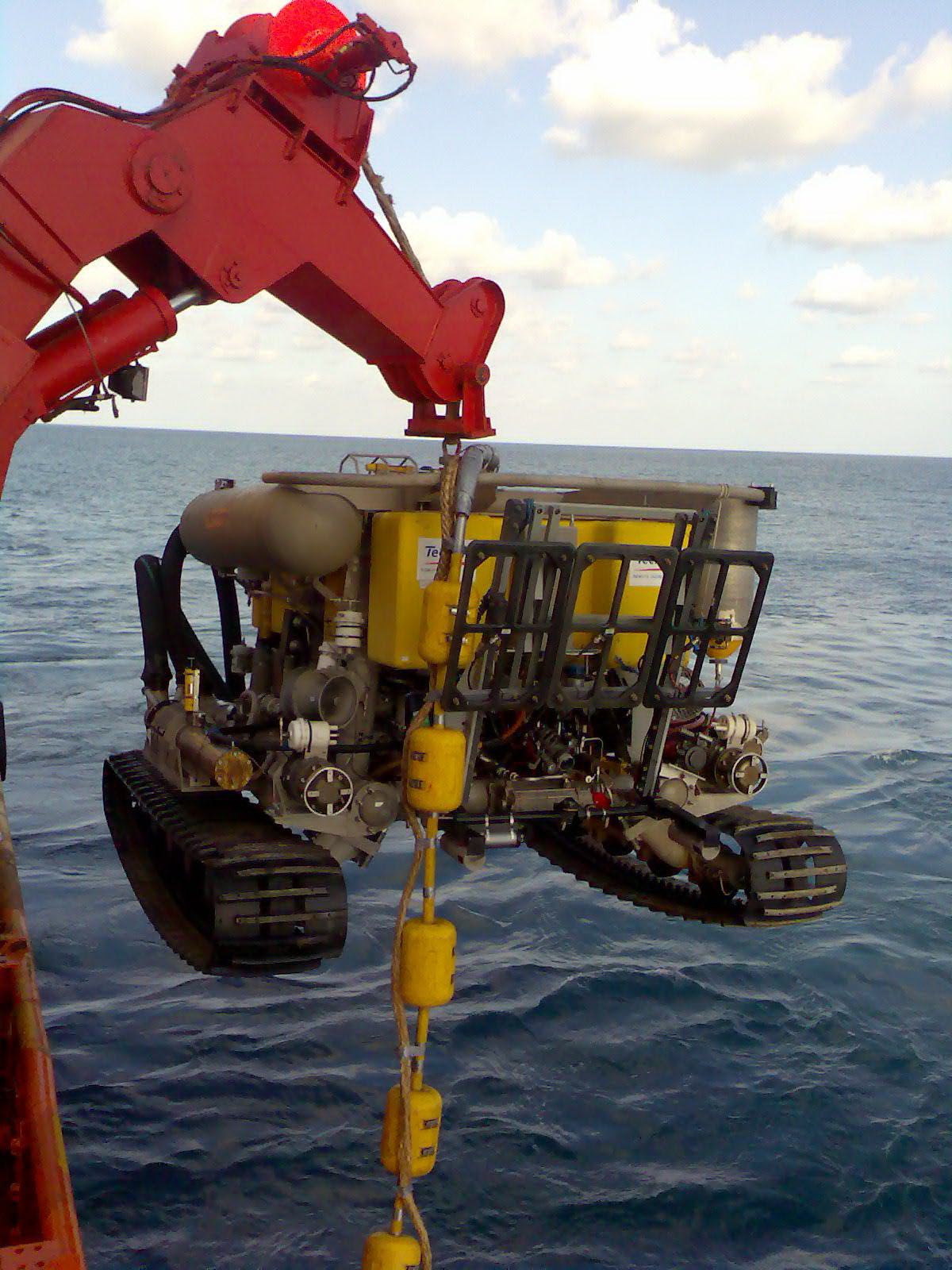

A bottom crawler is an underwater exploration, research and work vehicle. It is designed to sink to the bottom of a body of water, where it uses the traction of its wheels or tracks against the bottom and can move a load. It can be crewed or uncrewed. It can tethered to a surface ship by a cable or cables providing power, control, video, and lifting capabilities, but this is not essential.

== Applications ==
Such devices have been proposed for use in deep sea mining.

It was considered as a platform for nuclear missiles, but was rejected because it is restricted to essentially two dimensions, unlike a ballistic missile submarine.

== Limitations ==
Its use is limited by the composition of the bottom; unless it is firm, the crawler can become immobilized by sinking into sediment. Another serious problem is that the tracks or wheels can stir up the sediment, causing it to seriously degrade vision.

Its power source can be internal (batteries) or external (cable), but each presents problems. Batteries are heavy and have limited capacity for sizable loads, while power cables can impede mobility.

== Remote Underwater Manipulator ==
In 1958, Victor Anderson began constructing the 10-ton, uncrewed Remote Underwater Manipulator (RUM) for the Scripps Institution of Oceanography which was based on a United States Marine Corps self-propelled rifle carrier. He attached a boom and claw which enabled it to manipulate objects up to 5 metres (16 ft) away. RUM was initially powered by a gasoline engine, but it was replaced by two electric motors. It is paired with the Ocean Research Buoy (ORB), a barge with a center well. RUM is lowered by crane, then a coaxial cable is attached for power and sensor signals.

RUM has taken core samples at depths down to 1,900 metres (6,200 ft) and has recovered equipment from 1,260 metres (4,130 ft).

== See also ==
- Benthic lander, an autonomous observational platform that sits on the seabed
