= 35-ton deep-submergence rescue vehicle =

Chinese Navy submarine rescue submersible

Class overview
- Operators: People's Liberation Army Navy
- Succeeded by: LR7
- In service: 1989 - present
- Completed: At least 2
- Active: 2

General characteristics
- Type: Deep-submergence rescue vehicle
- Displacement: 35 tons (full)
- Length: 14.9 metres (49 ft)
- Beam: 2.6 metres (8 ft 6 in)
- Installed power: 2 x silver-zinc batteries
- Propulsion: 1 shaft
- Speed: 4 knots (7.4 km/h; 4.6 mph)
- Endurance: 20 hours at 2 knots
- Capacity: Six or 22 survivors
- Crew: 3
- Sensors & processing systems: Active sonar

The People's Republic of China developed a class of 35-ton deep-submergence rescue vehicle (DSRV) for the People's Liberation Army Navy (PLAN). It was first tested in 1986 and operational in 1989.

The DSRV may perform a rescue at depths up to 200 metres (660 ft). Six or 22 survivors could be carried. This suited contemporary PLAN submarines which deployed infrequently and typically to coastal waters.

The submarine may also perform salvage work. It has a manipulator arm and a diving chamber for six divers.

== See also ==
- Type 925 submarine support ship, used as motherships for these DSRVs.

== Sources ==
- Saunders, Stephan, ed. (2015). Jane's Fighting Ships 2015-2016. Jane's Information Group. ISBN 978-0710631435.
- Wertheim, Eric (2013). The Naval Institute Guide to Combat Fleets of the World: Their Ships, Aircraft, and Systems (16 ed.). Annapolis, Maryland: Naval Institute Press. ISBN 978-1591149545.
