= Benthic lander =

Platform for measurements on the seabed

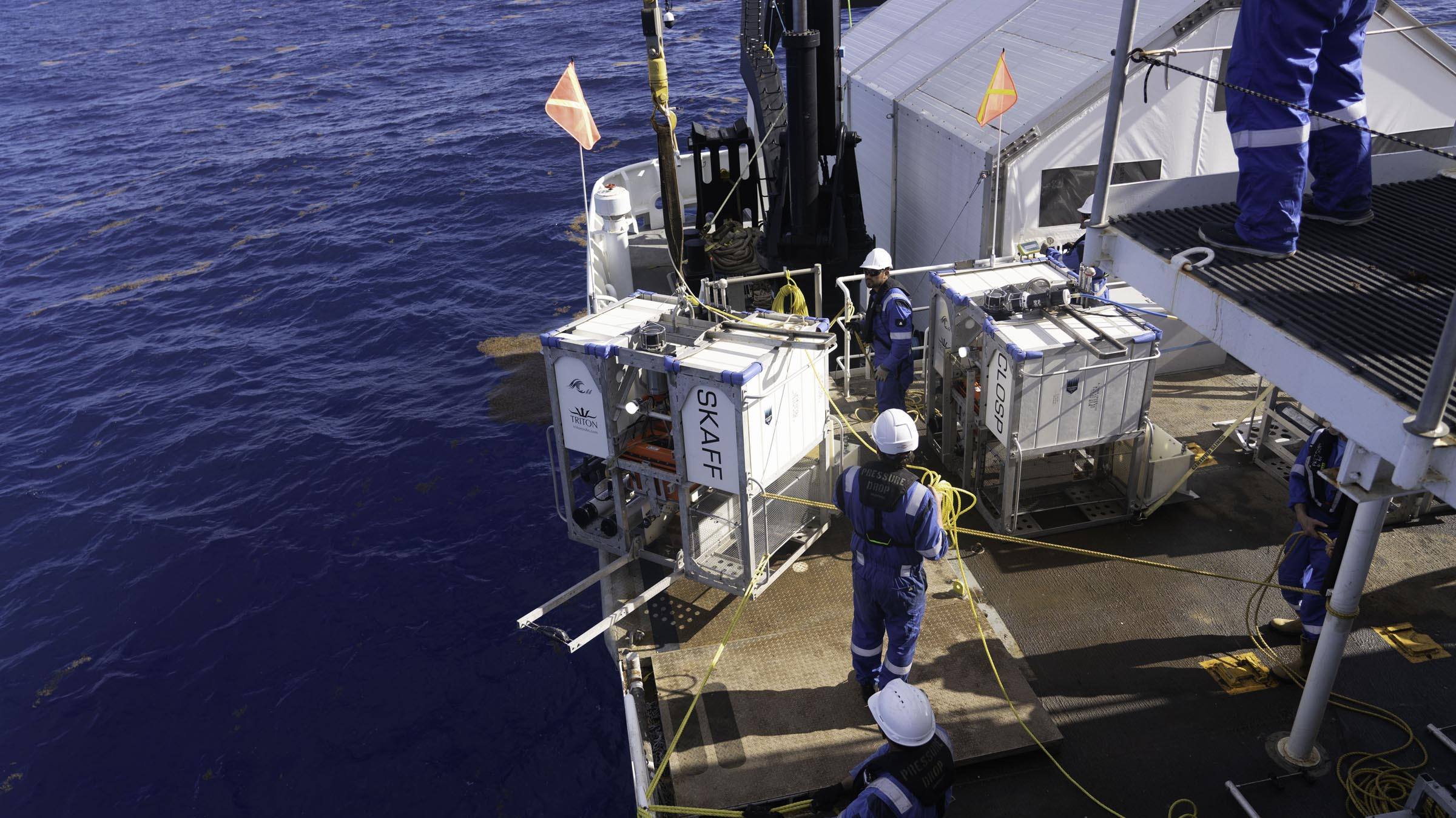
Two benthic landers are prepared for a deployment during the Five Deeps Expedition.

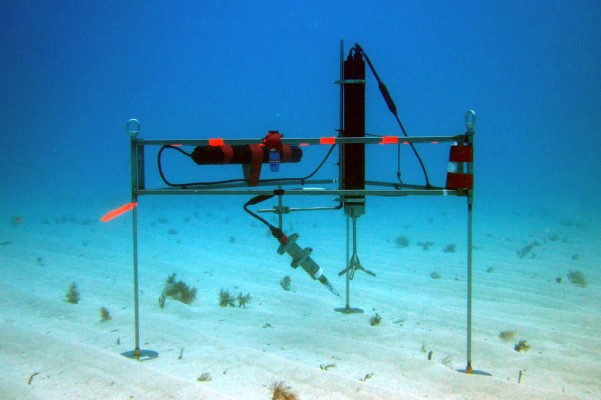
A benthic lander uses the eddy correlation technique to measure oxygen flux in a benthic environment.

A benthic lander is an autonomous observational platform that sits on the seabed, or benthic zone, to record physical, chemical or biological activity.

Benthic landers have deployment durations from a few days (for biological studies) to several years (for physical oceanography studies). In these studies they conduct a variety of underwater measurements, and thus different lander configurations exist to meet differing needs for different measurements.

== Purpose ==
Samples that are brought up from the seabed undergo large changes in temperature and pressure, thus changing their physical and chemical composition and properties. This change in properties means that any measurements taken from samples brought to the surface do not provide accurate data. In order to avoid this, it is best that the measurements are taken directly at the seabed level, without moving the samples. Initially, to prevent altering samples, divers would go to the sea bed and carry out the experiments. However, divers have a very small range of depth and a short time under water and cause a large disturbance to the sea bed, thereby introducing more error into the measurements. These shortcomings are improved by using benthic landers as they have a much larger depth and time capacity than divers and can be designed to cause minimal disturbance to the sea floor. Some common uses for the collected seabed data include studying currents, tides, and microseismic and magnetic field activity and monitoring marine life.

== Variations ==
Benthic landers come in a variety of shapes and sizes depending upon the instrumentation they carry, and are typically capable of working at any ocean depth. One type of instrumentation that is often used on benthic landers is an eddy correlation instrument that measures oxygen flux. Different types of landers are used depending on the length and nature of the mission. Longer duration mission landers are typically equipped with ultrasonic sensors, LiDAR, and cameras in order to intelligently navigate the seabed. Additionally, depending on what measurements the mission is intended to take, the lander can be configured to disrupt the environment in different ways enabling for higher precision of certain data sets at the tradeoff of others. New technologies are constantly being developed to improve lander data collection, one example being holography, which is meant to be utilized to take measurements of the seabed far from the lander.

== See also ==
- Marine snow
- Mooring (oceanography)
- Bottom crawler
