= Shenyang Institute of Automation =

Chinese research institute

Shenyang Institute of Automation (Chinese: 沈阳自动化研究所) of the Chinese Academy of Sciences (CAS) was founded in 1958. It is mainly engaged in mechatronic engineering, pattern recognition and intelligent system, control theory and control engineering, computer applied technology.
