= China Shipbuilding Industry Corporation =

Chinese shipbuilding conglomerate

- Native name: 中国船舶重工股份有限公司
- Type: State owned company
- Industry: Shipbuilding, defense
- Predecessor: China State Shipbuilding Corporation
- Founded: 1 July 1999; 27 years ago
- Fate: Merged with China State Shipbuilding Corporation
- Successor: China State Shipbuilding Corporation Limited
- Headquarters: Haidian District, Beijing, China
- Area served: Worldwide
- Key people: Hu Wenming (胡问鸣) (Chairman)
- Products: Ships, submarines, diesel engines, storage batteries, large steel structure fabrications, port machinery, turbochargers, tobacco machinery, gas meters and automation distribution systems
- Parent: SASAC
- Website: www.csic.com.cn

China Shipbuilding Industry Corporation
- Simplified Chinese: 中国船舶重工股份有限公司
- Traditional Chinese: 中國船舶重工股份有限公司
Transcriptions
Standard Mandarin
- Hanyu Pinyin: Zhōngguó Chuánbó Zhònggōng Gǔfèn Yǒuxiàn Gōngsī

Abbreviation
- Chinese: 中船重工
Transcriptions
Standard Mandarin
- Hanyu Pinyin: Zhōng Chuán Zhònggōng

China Shipbuilding Industry Company Limited
- Traded as: SSE: 601989; CSI 300
- Industry: Shipbuilding
- Headquarters: Beijing, China
- Area served: Worldwide
- Website: csicl.com.cn

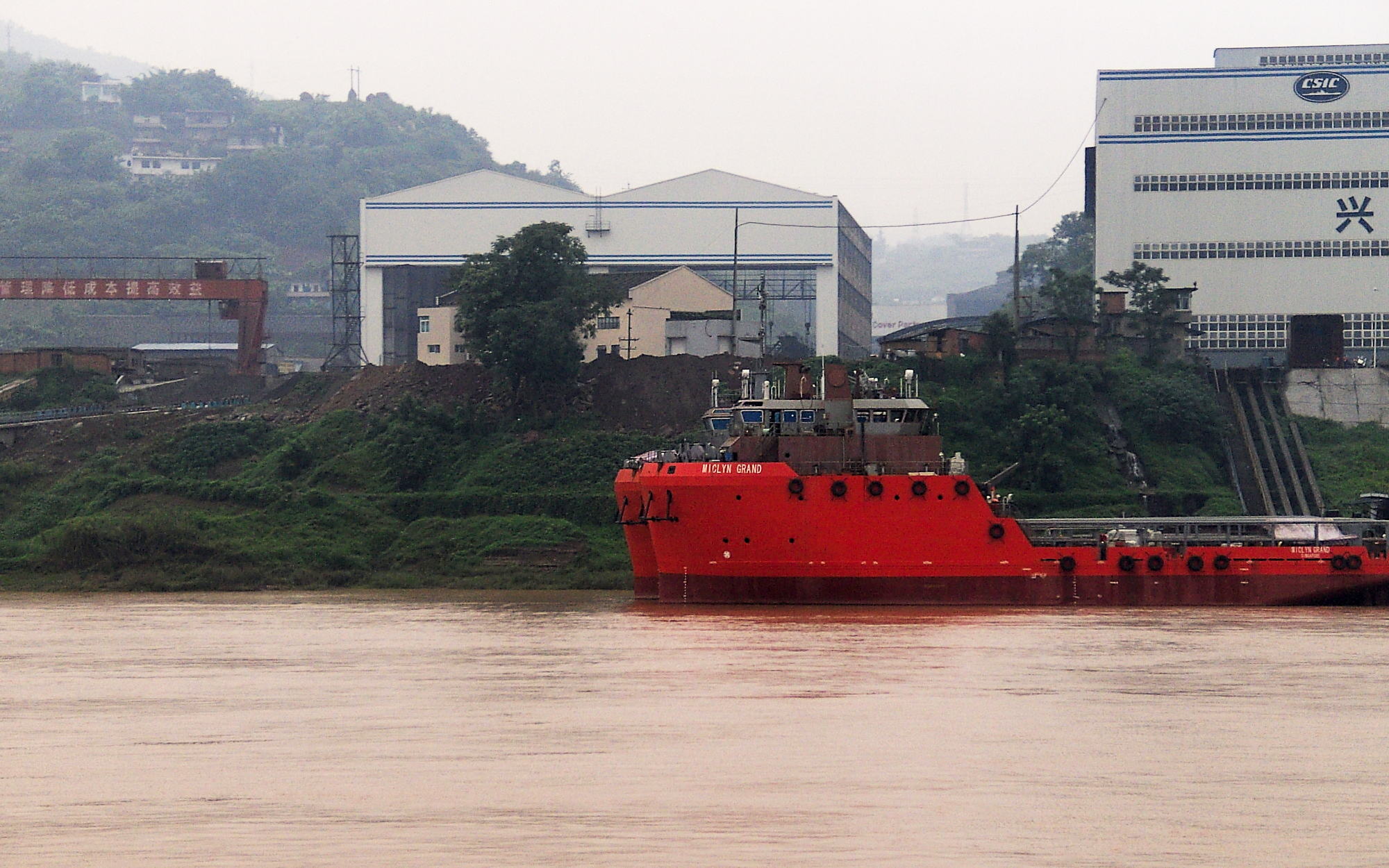
The CSIC Chuandong Shipyard in Miaoyin'an, Chongqing

The China Shipbuilding Industry Corporation (CSIC) was one of the two largest shipbuilding conglomerates in the People's Republic of China, the other was the China State Shipbuilding Corporation (CSSC). In 2019, CSIC was merged into CSSC.

CSIC was formed by the Government of the People's Republic of China on 1 July 1999 from companies spun off from CSSC, and is 100% owned by State-owned Assets Supervision and Administration Commission (SASAC) of State Council. Headquartered in Beijing, the CSIC handled shipbuilding activities in the north and the west of China, while the China State Shipbuilding Corporation (CSSC) dealt with those in the east and the south of the country.

CSIC's subsidiary, China Shipbuilding Industry Company Limited (CSICL), was listed on the Shanghai Stock Exchange in 2008. Its trade arm is China Shipbuilding & Offshore International Co. Ltd (CSOC).

CSIC developed 10 main product sections: shipbuilding, marine engineering, diesel engines, storage batteries, large steel structure fabrications, port machinery, turbochargers, tobacco machinery, gas meters, and automation distribution systems.

The main business scope of CSIC included management of all state owned assets of the corporation and its subsidiaries, domestic and overseas investment and financing, undertaking scientific research and production of military products, mainly of warships, design, production and repair of domestic and overseas civil vessels, marine equipment and other non-ship products, various forms of economic and technological co-operation, overseas turnkey project contracting, labour export, projects of production with foreign materials, engineering project contracting, engineering construction, building construction and installation, and other business authorized.

== History ==
CSIC consisted of 96 enterprises located in northern China, and employed over 300,000 people. Assets included shipbuilding and industrial enterprises in Dalian (Dalian Shipbuilding Industry Company), Tianjin, Qingdao, Wuhan, Xi'an, Chongqing, and Kunming, as well as 30 research institutes and ten laboratories developing naval and civil vessels and related equipment.

China State Shipbuilding Corporation (CSSC) carried out fundamental institutional restructuring. Ship building and repair enterprises and related equipment manufacturers formerly owned by CSSC in areas of Dalian, Tianjin, Wuhan, Kunming and Xi'an, together with majority of the institutes under China Ship Research & Development Academy, formed China Shipbuilding Industry Corporation (CSIC), which was founded on 1 July 1999 in Beijing. This was part of the overall State Council initiative of 1 July 1999, under which the Chinese government split the top five Defense and Technology Corporations into ten new enterprises. These corporations are all large state-owned enterprises (SOEs) under direct supervision of the State Council. These SOEs include the China State Shipbuilding Corporation (CSSC) and the China Shipbuilding Industry Corporation (CSIC).

=== Merger with China State Shipbuilding Corporation ===
On 26 November 2019, the shipbuilding conglomerate merged with China State Shipbuilding Corporation again to form new China State Shipbuilding Corporation. The new entity was the world's largest shipbuilder with 20% global market share and US$110 billion in assets. The main factor behind the merger between the two shipbuilding behemoths was corruption within CSIC's structure.

=== US investment and export restrictions ===
In November 2020, Donald Trump issued an executive order prohibiting any American company or individual from owning shares in companies that the United States Department of Defense has listed as having links to the People's Liberation Army, which included CSIC.

In December 2020, the United States Department of Commerce added 25 research institutes affiliated with CSIC to the Bureau of Industry and Security's Entity List due to their role in territorial disputes in the South China Sea.

== See also ==
- China State Shipbuilding Corporation
- China Shipbuilding Corporation (Republic of China)
- CSOC International Branch Limited
- Sinpu Ocean
- China Shipbuilding Science Research Center
