= Underwater survey =

Inspection or measurement in or of an underwater environment

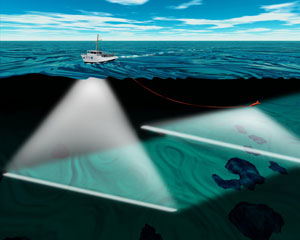
Graphic depicting NOAA hydrographic survey ship conducting multibeam and side scan sonar operations

An underwater survey is a survey performed in an underwater environment or conducted remotely on an underwater object or region. Surveys can have several meanings. The word originates in Medieval Latin with meanings of looking over and detailed study of a subject. One meaning is the accurate measurement of a geographical region, usually to plot the positions of features as a scale map of the region. This meaning is often used in scientific contexts, and also in civil engineering and mineral extraction. Another meaning, often used in a civil, structural, or marine engineering context, is the inspection of a structure or vessel to compare the actual condition with the specified nominal condition, usually to report on the actual condition and compliance with, or deviations from, the nominal condition, for quality control, damage assessment, valuation, insurance, maintenance, and similar purposes. In other contexts it can mean inspection of a region to establish presence and distribution of specified content, such as living organisms, either to establish a baseline, or to compare with a baseline.

These types of surveys may be done in or of the underwater environment, in which case they may be referred to as underwater surveys, which may include bathymetric, hydrographic, and geological surveys, archaeological surveys, ecological surveys, and structural or vessel safety surveys. In some cases, they can be done by remote sensing, using a variety of tools, and sometimes by direct human intervention, usually by a professional diver. Underwater surveys are an essential part of the planning, and often of quality control and monitoring, of underwater construction, dredging, mineral extraction, ecological monitoring, and archaeological investigations. They are often required as part of an ecological impact study.

== Types ==
The types of underwater survey include, but are not necessarily restricted to, archeological, bathymetric and hydrographic, ecological, geological, and construction site surveys, and inspection surveys of marine and coastal structures and vessels afloat. A survey of the vessel structural condition and the adjacent site and hydrographic conditions would also be done when assessing proposed marine salvage operations.

=== Archaeological surveys ===
Archaeological surveys of underwater sites have traditionally been done by divers, but at sites where the depth is too great, sonar surveys have been done from surface and submersible vehicles, and photomosaic techniques have been done using ROUVs. Traditional methods include direct measurement from a baseline or grid set up at the site, and triangulation by direct measurement from marks of known position installed at the site, in the same way these would be used at a terrestrial site. Accuracy may be compromised by water conditions.

This work is usually done by archaeologists who are qualified scientific divers.

=== Bathymetric and hydrographic surveys ===
Bathymetric surveys are traditionally done from the surface, by measuring depth (soundings) at measured positions along transect lines and later plotting the data onto a bathymetric chart, on which lines of constant depth (isobaths) may be drawn by interpolation of soundings. It is also conventional to provide a representative set of spot depths on the chart. Originally, soundings were made manually by measuring the length of a weighted line lowered to the bottom, bur after the development of accurate and reliable echo-sounding equipment it became the standard method. Data recording was automated when the equipment became available, and later precise position data was integrated into the data sets. Multibeam sonar with GPS position data corrected for vessel motion and combined in real time is the state of the art in the early 21st century.

Bathymetric surveys of some bodies of water have required different procedures, particularly for sinkholes, caverns and caves where a significant portion of the bottom walls, and in some cases ceilings, are not visible to the sounding equipment from the surface, and it has been necessary to use remotely operated underwater vehicles or divers to gather the data. One of the complications of this class of underwater survey is the relative difficulty of establishing a baseline, or an accurate position for the ROUV, as GPS signals do not propagate through water. In some cases a physical line has been used, but sometimes a baseline can be established using sonar transducers set up at accurately surveyed positions, and relative offsets measured.

=== Ecological surveys ===
Various techniques have been used for underwater ecological surveys. Divers are frequently used to collect data, either by direct observation and recording, or by photographic recording at recorded locations, which may be specified to a given precision depending on the requirements of the project and available location technology.

One method is for divers to use geolocated photographs taken by divers following a route recorded by a towed surface GPS receiver on a float kept above the camera by line tension. Date and time data are recorded concurrently by the camera and GPS unit, allowing position data for each photo to be extracted by post-processing or inspection. GPS precision may be augmented by Wide Area Augmentation System (WAAS). Depth data may be captured on camera from dive computers or depth gauges carried by the divers or mounted in view of the camera. The photos may be viewed on a map or via a geographic information system (GIS) for analysis. This method can also be used for spatial surveys of small areas, particularly in places where a survey vessel cannot go. To map an area the diver tows the float along bottom contours and the GPS track is used to create a map using drafting or GIS software. Spot depths may also be taken, using a digital camera to record time and depth from a depth gauge or dive computer to synchronize with the track data. This procedure can be combined with photographic recording of the benthic communities at intervals along the contour or perimeter.

Surveys by professional divers tend to be relatively expensive, and some ecological monitoring programs and data gathering programs have enlisted the aid of volunteer recreational divers to conduct data collection appropriate to their certification and in some cases, further training, such as the Australian-based Reef Life Survey. Others, such as iNaturalist, have used the crowdsourcing system of uploaded digital photographic records of observations, with location data to whatever standard is available, which can vary considerably, thereby taking advantage of the thousands of amateur photographers who record their underwater surroundings anyway. In this way millions of observations from dive sites all over the world have been accumulated.

Types of ecological survey:

- Transect – Path along which organisms are recorded
- Quadrat – Rectangular frame used to demarcate a part of the substrate for detailed analysis
- Photogrammetry – Taking measurements using photography
- Baited remote underwater video – Automated photography device

Sometimes more than one type of observations are combined in a survey. For example, the Reef Life Survey procedure includes three components along the same transect: Visual count of fish, visual count of benthic fauna, and photographs of the bottom at regular intervals.

=== Geological surveys ===
A geological survey is the systematic investigation of the geology beneath a given piece of ground for the purpose of creating a geological map or model. Underwater geological surveying employs techniques from the underwater equivalent of a traditional walk-over survey, studying outcrops and landforms, to intrusive methods, such as boreholes, to the use of geophysical techniques and remote sensing methods. An underwater geological survey map typically superimposes the surveyed extent and boundaries of geological units on a bathymetric map, together with information at points (such as measurements of orientation of bedding planes) and lines (such as the intersection of faults with the seabed surface). The map may include cross sections to illustrate the three-dimensional interpretation. Much of this work is done from surface vessels by remote sensing, bur in some cases such as in flooded caves, measurement and sampling requires remotely operated underwater vehicles or direct intervention by divers.

Reflection seismology techniques are used for shipborne subsurface remote sensing. Seismic sources include air guns, sparkers and boomers.

Airborne geophysical methods include magnetic, electromagnetic, and gravity measurement.

=== Site surveys ===
Site surveys are inspections of an area where work is proposed, to gather information for a design. It can determine a precise location, access, best orientation for the site and the location of obstacles. The type of site survey and the best practices required depend on the nature of the project. In hydrocarbon exploration, for example, site surveys are run over the proposed locations of offshore exploration or appraisal wells. They consist typically of a tight grid of high resolution (high frequency) reflection seismology profiles to look for possible gas hazards in the shallow section beneath the seabed and detailed bathymetric data to look for possible obstacles on the seafloor (e.g. shipwrecks, existing pipelines) using multibeam echosounders.

A type of site survey is performed during marine salvage operations, to assess the structural condition of a stranded vessel and to identify aspects of the vessel, site and environment that may affect the operation. Such a survey may include investigation of hull structural and watertight integrity, extent of flooding, bathymetry and geology of the immediate vicinity, currents and tidal effects, hazards, and possible environmental impact of the salvage work.

=== Structural surveys ===
Structural integrity inspections of inland, coastal and offshore underwater structures, including bridges, dams, causeways, harbours, breakwaters, jetties, embankments, levees, petroleum and gas production platforms and infrastructure, pipelines, wellheads and moorings.

==== Vessel safety surveys ====
Vessel safety surveys are inspections of the structure and equipment of a vessel to assess the condition of the surveyed items and check that they comply with legal or classification society requirements for insurance and registration. They may occur at any time when there is reason to suspect that the condition has changed significantly since the previous survey, or as a condition of purchase, and the first survey is generally during construction (built under survey) or before first registration. The criteria for acceptance are defined by the licensing or registration authority for a variety of equipment vital to the safe operation of the vessel, such as hull structure, static stability, propulsion machinery, auxiliary machinery, safety equipment, lifting equipment, rigging, ground tackle, etc.

Some surveys must be done in dry dock, but this is expensive, and in some cases for intermediate surveys the underwater part of the external survey may be done afloat using divers or ROUVs to do the inspection, usually providing live video to the surveyor, or possibly video recording for later analysis. Live video has the advantage that the surveyor can instruct the diver to investigate further or provide views from other angles. Live video would normally also be recorded for the records.

== Tools ==
=== Remote measurement through water ===
- Single beam echosounders are used to measure distance of a reflecting surface, like the seabed, by comparing the time between emission of a sound signal and first receiving the reflected signal back at the transceiver, using the speed of sound in water. They are usually used to make a series of spot depth measurements along the path of the transducer, which can be used to map the bottom profile.
- Multibeam echosounders use beamforming to extract directional information from the returning sound waves, producing a swath of depth readings across the path of the transducer from a single ping. The rate of data acquisition is far greater than for single beam systems, but they are susceptible to shadowing effects from high-profile surfaces offset to the side of the transducer path. This can be compensated by overlapping swaths. The data is processed to give a three dimensional image of the bottom.
- Acoustic Doppler current profilers (ADCP) are hydro-acoustic current meters, used to measure water current velocities over a depth range using the Doppler effect of sound waves scattered back from particles within the water column. The traveling time of the sound waves gives the distance, and the frequency shift of the echo is proportional to the water velocity along the acoustic path.
- Lidar uses a laser light source and optical receiver to measure range and direction of reflected signals, but is limited by the water transparency.
- Side-scan sonar is used to efficiently create images of large areas of the sea floor, as seen from the point of view of the transducer.
- Seismic sources such as sparkers and boomers are used in seismic reflection profiling, using sound pulse frequencies that effectively penetrate the solid seabed and are partially reflected by changes in acoustic impedance, often signifying a change in rock type. Boomers work in the 500 to 4000 Hz range. and sparkers in the 200 to 800 Hz range. Lower frequency will usually penetrate to greater depth, but with lower resolution.

==== Platforms ====
- Dedicated survey vessels and vessels of opportunity. Diving support vessels for surface-supplied diving operations, and dive boats for scuba surveys. DSVs are often fitted for ROV support and other underwater surveys.
- Autonomous survey vessels are more economical to operate than crewed vessels, and can be sent into waters that are too shallow or confined or otherwise hazardous for larger crewed vessels.
- Autonomous underwater vehicles are more economical than crewed vehicles. Researchers have focused on the development of AUVs for long-term data collection in oceanography and coastal management. The oil and gas industry uses AUVs to make detailed maps of the seafloor before they start building subsea infrastructure. The AUV allows survey companies to conduct precise surveys of areas where traditional bathymetric surveys would be less effective or too costly. Also, post-lay pipe surveys which include pipeline inspection are possible. The use of AUVs for pipeline inspection and inspection of underwater man-made structures is becoming more common. Scientists use AUVs to study lakes, the ocean, and the ocean floor. A variety of sensors can also be carried to measure the concentration of various elements or compounds in the water, the absorption or reflection of light, and the presence of microscopic life. Examples include conductivity-temperature-depth sensors (CTDs), chlorophyll fluorometers, and pH sensors.
- Remotely operated underwater vehicles. Survey or inspection ROVs are generally smaller than workclass ROVs and are often sub-classified as either Class I: Observation Only or Class II Observation with payload. They are used to assist with hydrographic survey, and also for inspection work. Survey ROVs, although smaller than workclass, often have comparable performance with regard to the ability to hold position in currents, and often carry similar tools and equipment - lighting, cameras, sonar, USBL (Ultra-short baseline) beacon, and strobe flasher depending on the payload capability of the vehicle and the needs of the user.

==== Underwater position measurement systems ====
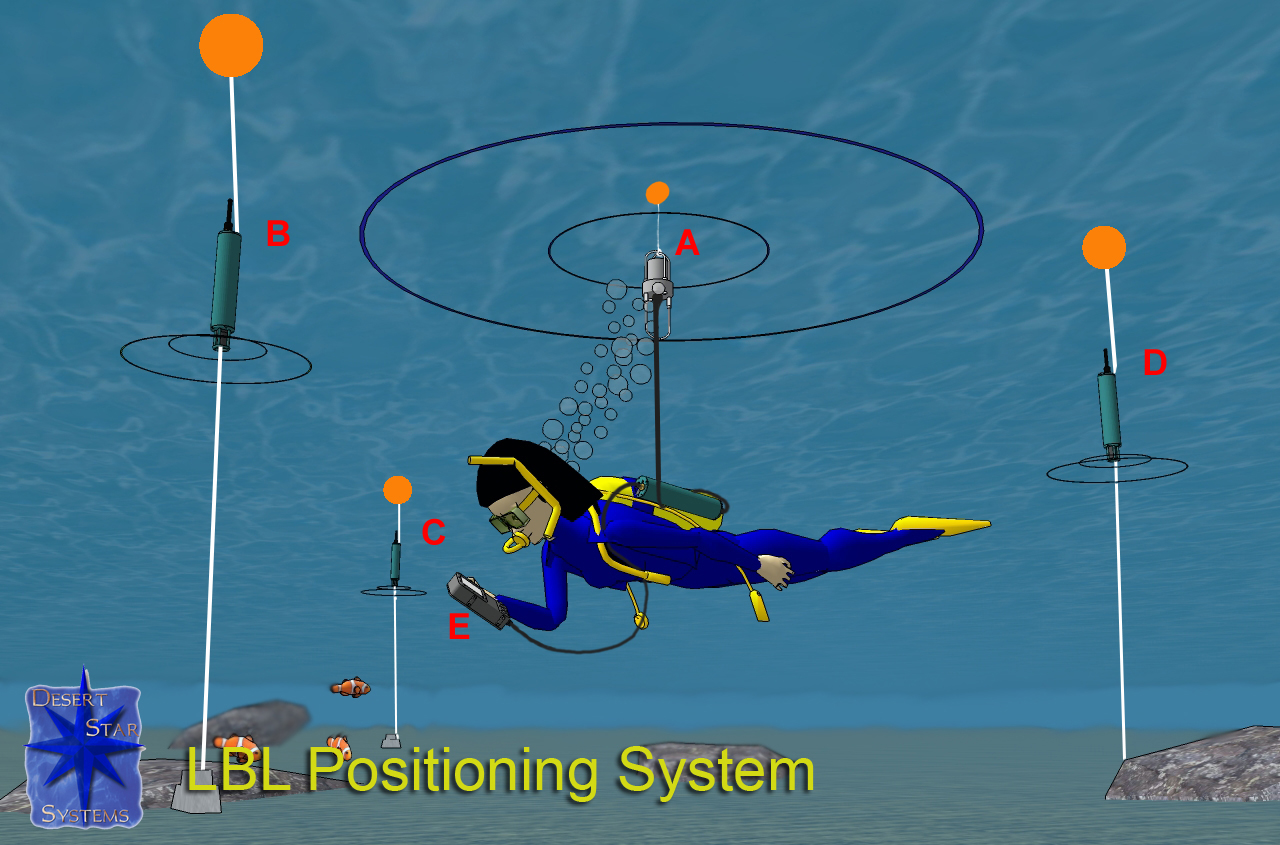
Method of operation of a long baseline acoustic positioning system

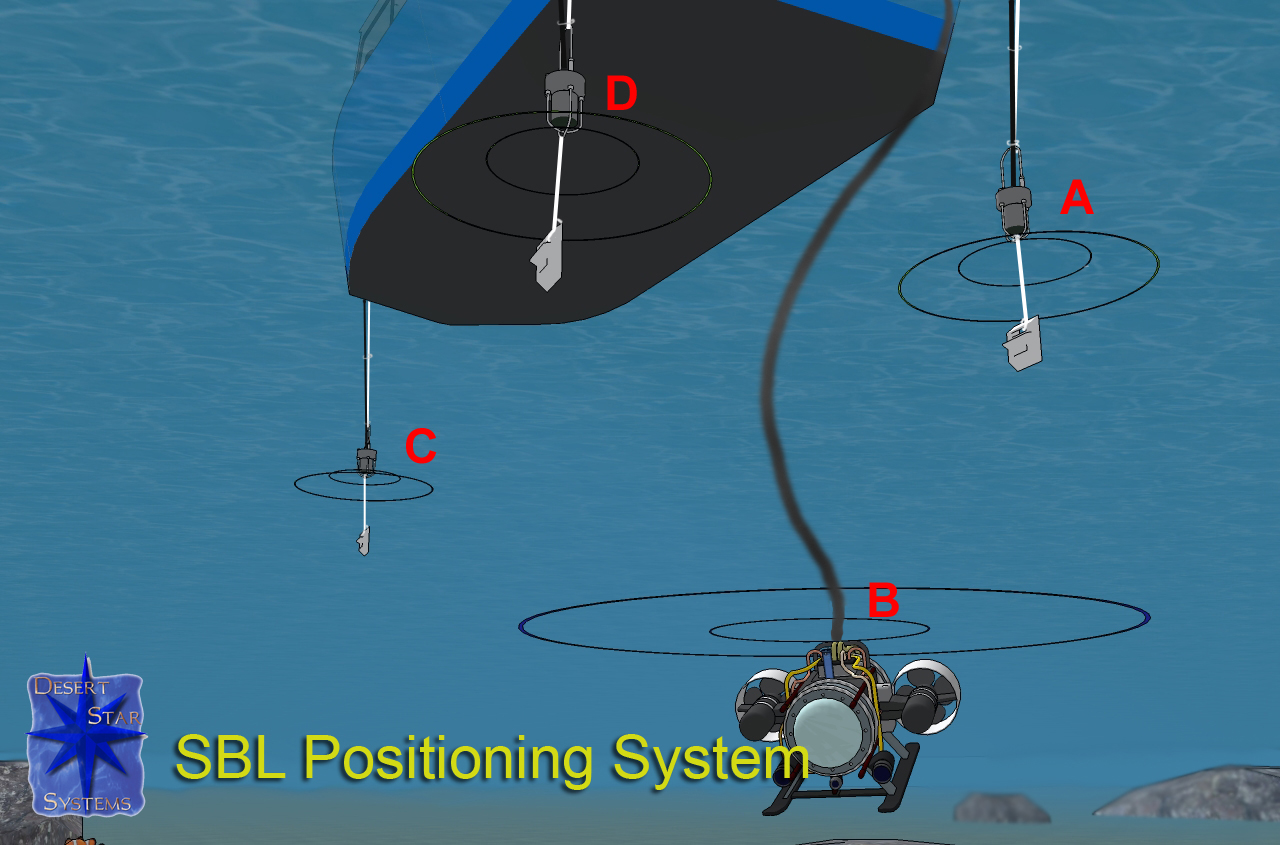
Method of operation of a short baseline acoustic positioning system

Underwater acoustic positioning systems are systems for the tracking, navigation and location of underwater vehicles or divers by means of acoustic distance and/or direction measurements, and subsequent position triangulation. They are commonly used in a wide variety of underwater work, including oil and gas exploration, ocean sciences, salvage operations, marine archaeology, law enforcement and military activities.

Long baseline acoustic positioning systems (LBL systems) use networks of sea-floor mounted baseline transponders as reference points for navigation. These are generally deployed around the perimeter of a work site. The LBL technique results in very high positioning accuracy and position stability that is independent of water depth. It is generally better than 1-meter and can reach a few centimeters accuracy. LBL systems are generally used for precision underwater survey work where the accuracy or position stability of ship-based short or ultra-short baseline positioning systems does not suffice.

Short baseline acoustic positioning system (SBL acoustic positioning systems) SBL systems do not require any seafloor mounted transponders or equipment and are thus suitable for tracking underwater targets from boats or ships that are either anchored or under way. However, unlike USBL systems, which offer a fixed accuracy, SBL positioning accuracy improves with transducer spacing. Thus, where space permits, such as when operating from larger vessels or a dock, the SBL system can achieve a precision and position robustness that is similar to that of sea floor mounted LBL systems, making the system suitable for high-accuracy survey work. When operating from a smaller vessel where transducer spacing is limited (i.e. when the baseline is short), the SBL system will exhibit reduced precision.

Ultra-short baseline acoustic positioning system (USBL), also known as super short base line (SSBL), consists of a transceiver, which is mounted under a ship, and a transponder or responder on the seafloor, on a towfish, or on an ROV. A computer, is used to calculate a position from the ranges and bearings measured by the transceiver. USBLs are also used in "inverted" (iUSBL) configurations, with the transceiver mounted on an autonomous underwater vehicle, and the transponder on the installation that launches it. In this case, the signal processing happens inside the vehicle to allow it to locate the transponder for applications such as automatic docking and target tracking.

=== Manual measurement underwater ===
Measurements can be made using a variety of instruments. Vertical position relative to the surface, also known as depth measurement, may use:

- Depth gauges (using pressure as a proxy)
- Dive computers (using pressure as a proxy)
- Measuring tapes (direct linear measurement)
- Pneumofathometers (using pressure as a proxy)

Length measurement in other directions, using:

- Measuring tape,
- Surveyor's chain,
- Calibrated distance line, particularly in cave surveys,
- Towed GPS receivers on floats (by spherical trigonometry)
- Inertial navigation system, integrated from accelerometer output in three dimensions
- Hand-held range-finding sonar
- Vernier and plain calipers, for small dimensions.

Length measurements may also be derived by triangulation from a baseline, angular measurement, and trigonometry

Angular measurements may be made using:

- Magnetic compass
- Protractor
- Clinometer
- Goniometer

Or may be derived from GPS positions, from linear triangulation and trigonometry, and from inertial navigation position data.

Non-destructive testing measurements may include:

- Ultrasonic thickness measurement
- Ultrasonic crack detection

Measurements of visibility, using Secchi discs and similar methods, and spot measurements of other physical and chemical characteristics by local measurementor recording by a diver, or sampling of the water and bottom composition.

=== Sampling and specimen collection ===
Samples of seafloor sediments and rock can be collected using grabs, coring devices, ROUVs and divers. Coring devices include core drills and impact penetrators. Divers and ROUV operators are more discriminating in their selection of samples than grabs and remotely operated coring devices. Biological samples can be collected by dredges, grabs, traps, or nets, but more directed sampling generally requires visual input and human intervention, and is commonly done by divers, ROUVs and crewed submersibles equipped for collection.

=== Recording and counting ===
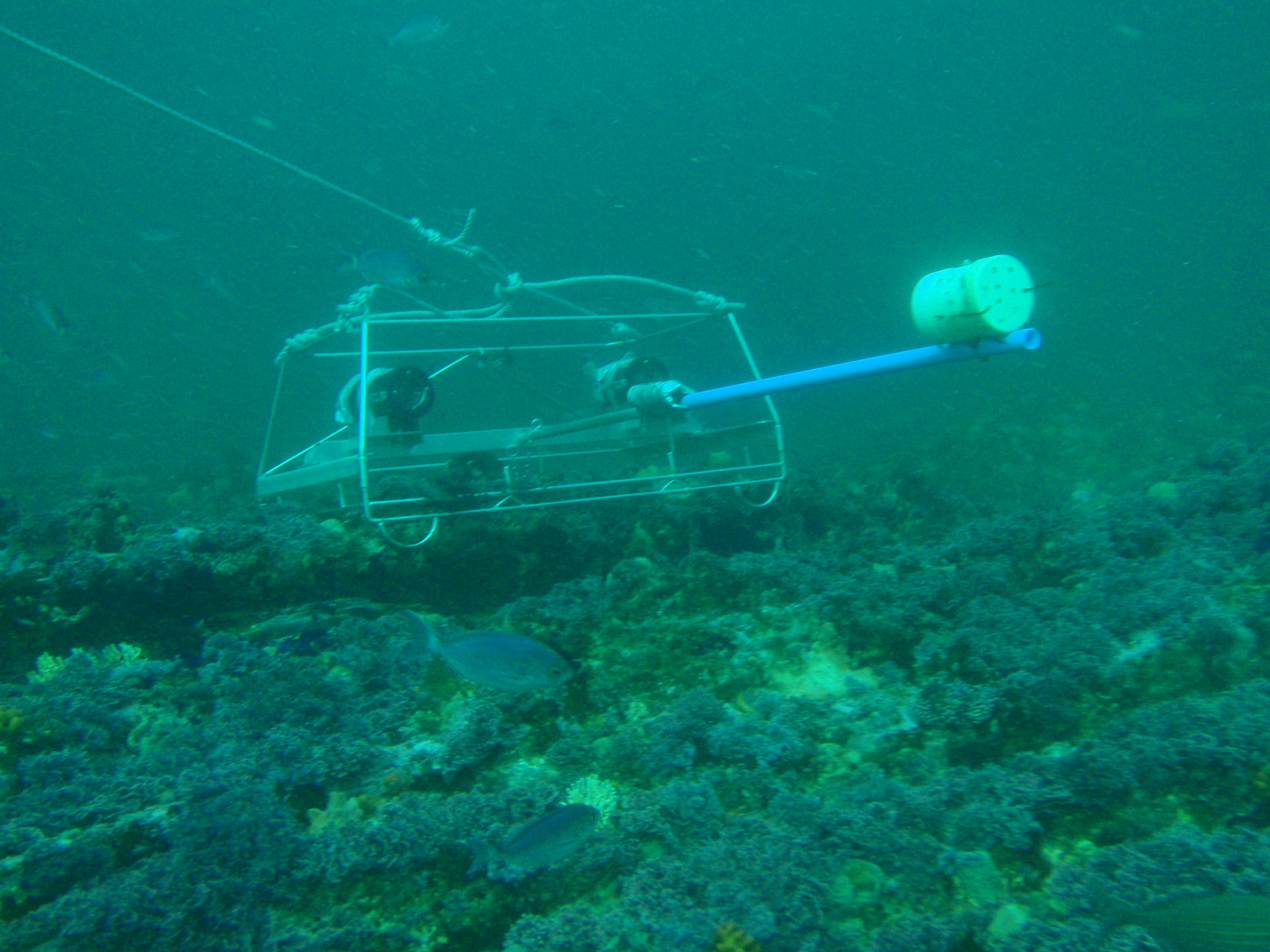
Stereo BRUV prototype deployed at the Tsitsikamma Marine Protected Area

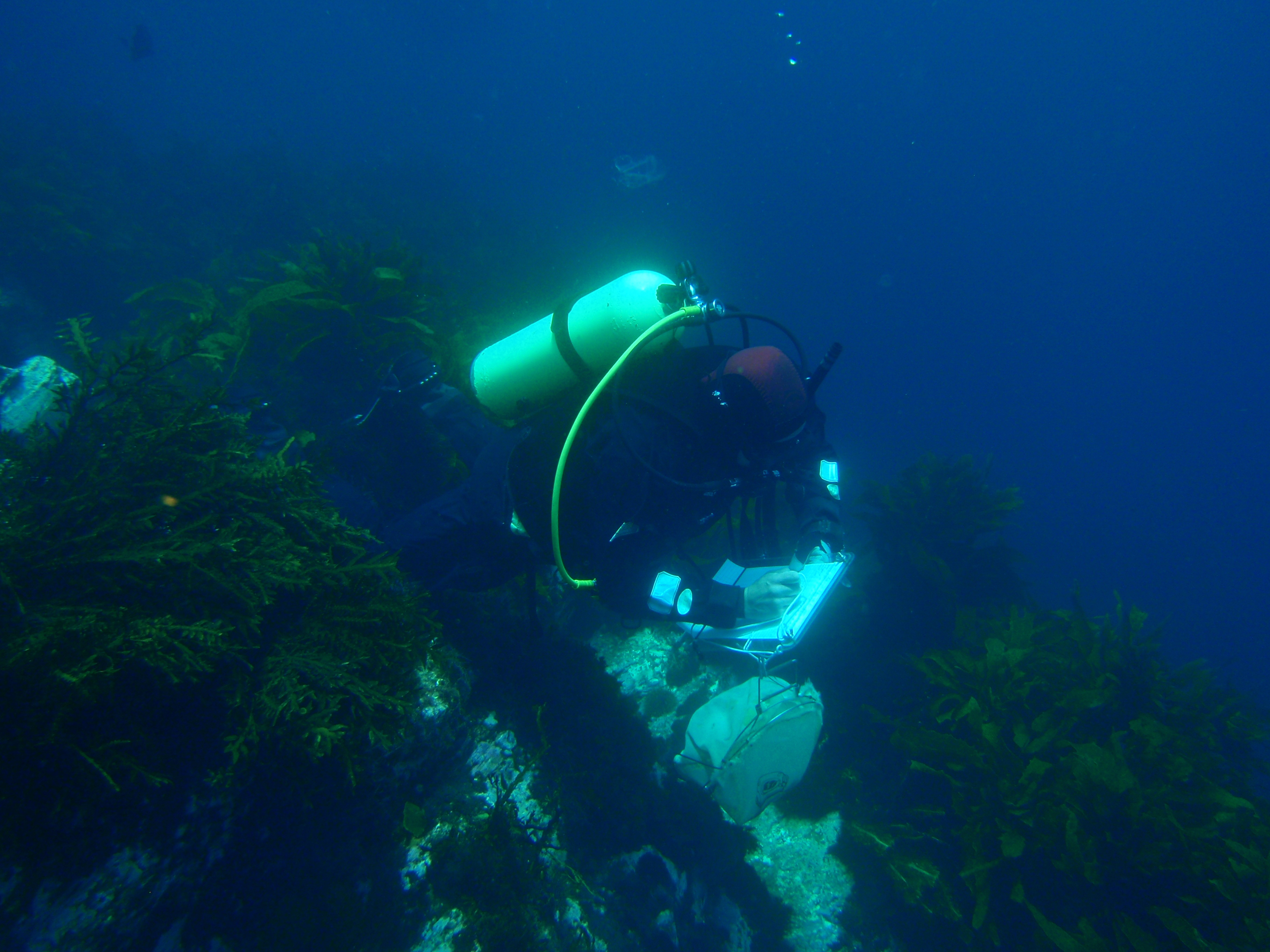
Diver swimming a transect for Reef Life Survey, recording observations on a checlist on a clipboard.

- Underwater photography. Digital underwater cameras can conveniently be used to record an image, and the time at which the photo was taken. In some cases direction, inclination and depth are also available from the camera, or can be recorded by photographing the display of appropriate instruments.
  - Jump cameras are cameras mounted on a frame that triggers an exposure when the frame hits the bottom. To operate, the frame is lowered until the rope slacks off, then lifted and the boat moved to the next position.
- Underwater videography, the branch of electronic underwater photography concerned with capturing underwater moving images, and live video feeds, which allow a remote operator to see the underwater environment from elsewhere.
  - Baited remote underwater video (BRUV) is a system used in marine biology research. By attracting fish into the field of view of a remotely controlled camera, the technique records fish diversity, abundance and behaviour of species. Sites are sampled by video recording the region surrounding a baited canister which is lowered to the bottom. The video can be transmitted directly to the surface by cable, or recorded for later analysis. Baited cameras are highly effective at attracting scavengers and subsequent predators, and are a non-invasive method of generating relative abundance indices for a number of marine species.
- Checklists are useful when a reasonably small range of objects or types of object are to be recorded as being present, as they reduce the amount of writing that must be done underwater. (legibility tends to suffer in cold water or in moving water)
- Clipboard or diver's slate and pencil, are used when sketches and measurements are to be recorded, and are versatile though not very efficient for data recording. Waterproof paper is available for use on clipboards, and can be printed with checklists.
- Quadrat frames are used to establish a discrete area for examination, and can be visually examined, photographed, or both.

== Presentation of results ==
Results of underwater surveys can be presented in several ways, depending on the target demographic and intended use of the data. A common presentation format is a map indicating spatial distribution or general topography, often involving a depth dimension. Drawings, photographic images, graphs, tables, and text descriptions may also be used, often in conjunction with one or more maps. Maps may also be used to indicate variations over time in comparison with a baseline.

== See also ==
- Baseline (science) – Initial known conditions used for comparison with later data
  - Shifting baseline – Type of change to how a system is measured
- Biosurvey – Scientific study of organisms to assess the condition of an ecological resource
- Calibration – Check on the accuracy of measurement devices
- Ground truth – Information provided by direct observation
- Reef Life Survey – Marine life monitoring programme based in Hobart, Tasmania
