= Long baseline acoustic positioning system =

Underwater tracking system

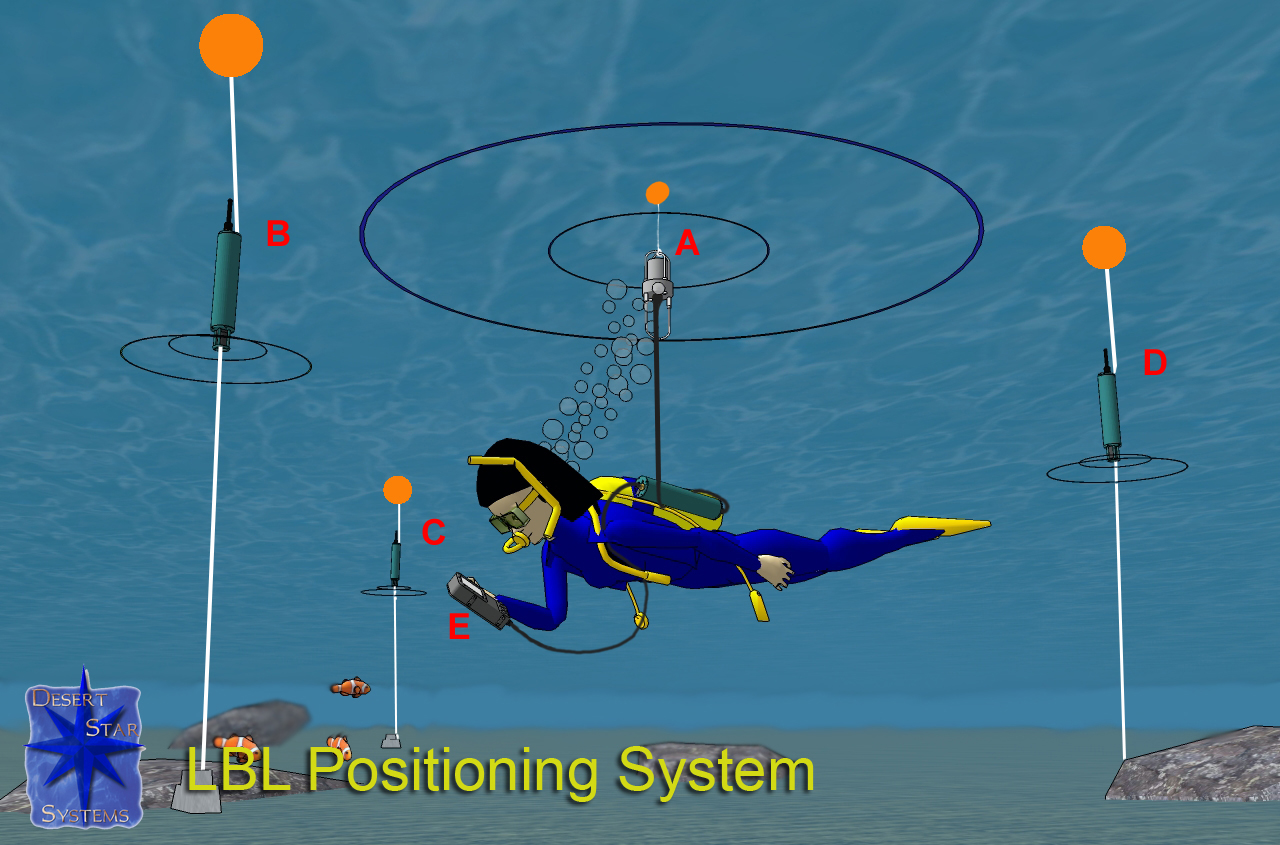
Figure 1: Method of the operation of a long baseline (LBL) acoustic positioning system

A long baseline (LBL) acoustic positioning system is one of three broad classes of underwater acoustic positioning systems that are used to track underwater vehicles and divers. The other two classes are ultra short baseline systems (USBL) and short baseline systems (SBL). LBL systems are unique in that they use networks of sea-floor mounted baseline transponders as reference points for navigation. These are generally deployed around the perimeter of a work site. The LBL technique results in very high positioning accuracy and position stability that is independent of water depth. It is generally better than 1-meter and can reach a few centimeters accuracy. LBL systems are generally employed for precision underwater survey work where the accuracy or position stability of ship-based (SBL, USBL) positioning systems does not suffice.

== Operation and performance ==
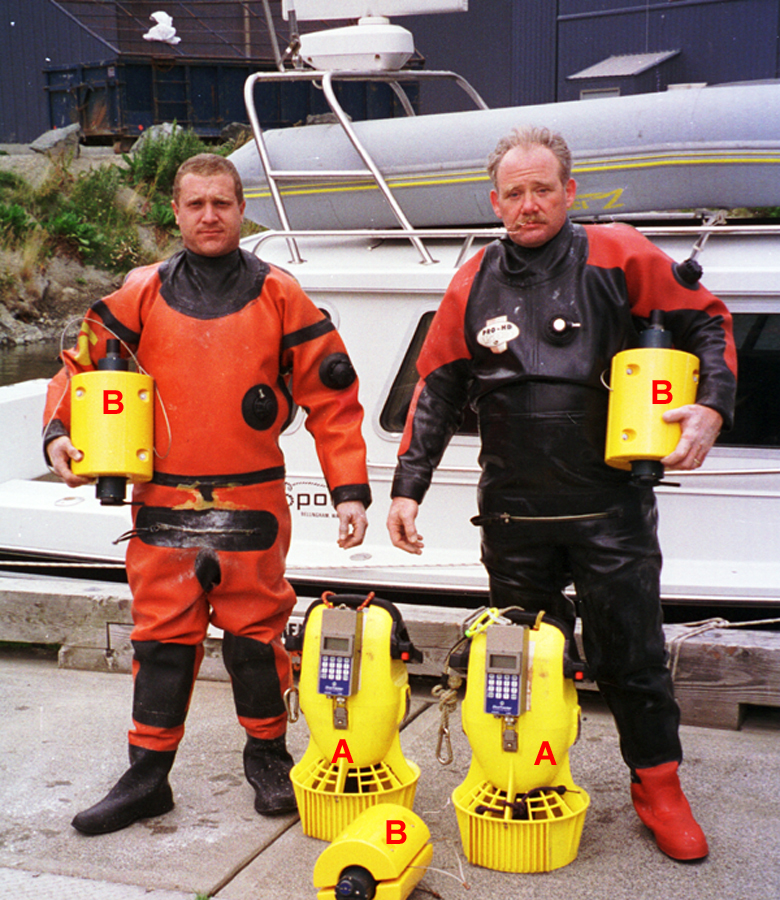
Figure 2: A dive team (Envirotech Diving) with their AquaMap LBL acoustic underwater positioning system including three baseline transponders (B) and diver stations (A) mounted on scooters. The baseline stations are first deployed in the corners of a work site. Their relative position is then precisely measured using the AquaMap system's automatic acoustic self-survey capability. For geo-referenced operations, the baseline positions are surveyed by differential GPS or a laser positioning equipment (total station). During a dive, the diver station interrogates the baseline stations to measure the distances, which are then converted to positions.

Long baseline systems determine the position of a vehicle or diver by acoustically measuring the distance from a vehicle or diver interrogator to three or more seafloor deployed baseline transponders. These range measurements, which are often supplemented by depth data from pressure sensors on the devices, are then used to triangulate the position of the vehicle or diver. In figure 1, a diver mounted interrogator (A) sends a signal, which is received by the baseline transponders (B, C, D). The transponders reply, and the replies are received again by the diver station (A). Signal run time measurements now yield the distances A-B, A-C and A-D, which are used to compute the diver position by triangulation or position search algorithms. The resulting positions are relative to the location of the baseline transducers. These can be readily converted to a geo-referenced coordinate system such as latitude/longitude or UTM if the geo-positions of the baseline stations are first established.

Long baseline systems get their name from the fact that the spacing of the baseline transponders is long or similar to the distance between the diver or vehicle and the transponders. That is, the baseline transponders are typically mounted in the corners of an underwater work site within which the vehicle or diver operates. This method yields an ideal geometry for positioning, in which any given error in acoustic range measurements produce only about an equivalent position error. This compares to SBL and USBL systems with shorter baselines where ranging disturbances of a given amount can result in much larger position errors. Further, the mounting of the baseline transponders on the sea floor eliminates the need for converting between reference frames, as is the case for USBL or SBL positioning systems mounted on moving vessels. Finally, sea floor mounting makes the positioning accuracy independent of water depth. For these reasons LBL systems are generally applied to tasks where the required standard of positioning accuracy or reliability exceeds the capabilities of USBL and SBL systems.

== History ==
The search and inspection of the lost nuclear submarine USS Thresher by the U.S. Navy oceanographic vessel USNS Mizar in 1963 is frequently credited as the origin of modern underwater acoustic navigation systems. Mizar primarily used a short baseline (SBL) system to track the bathyscaphe Trieste 1. However, its capability also included seafloor transponders, which in conjunction with early navigation satellites supported station-keeping with a precision of about 300 feet, considered remarkable at the time.

== Examples ==
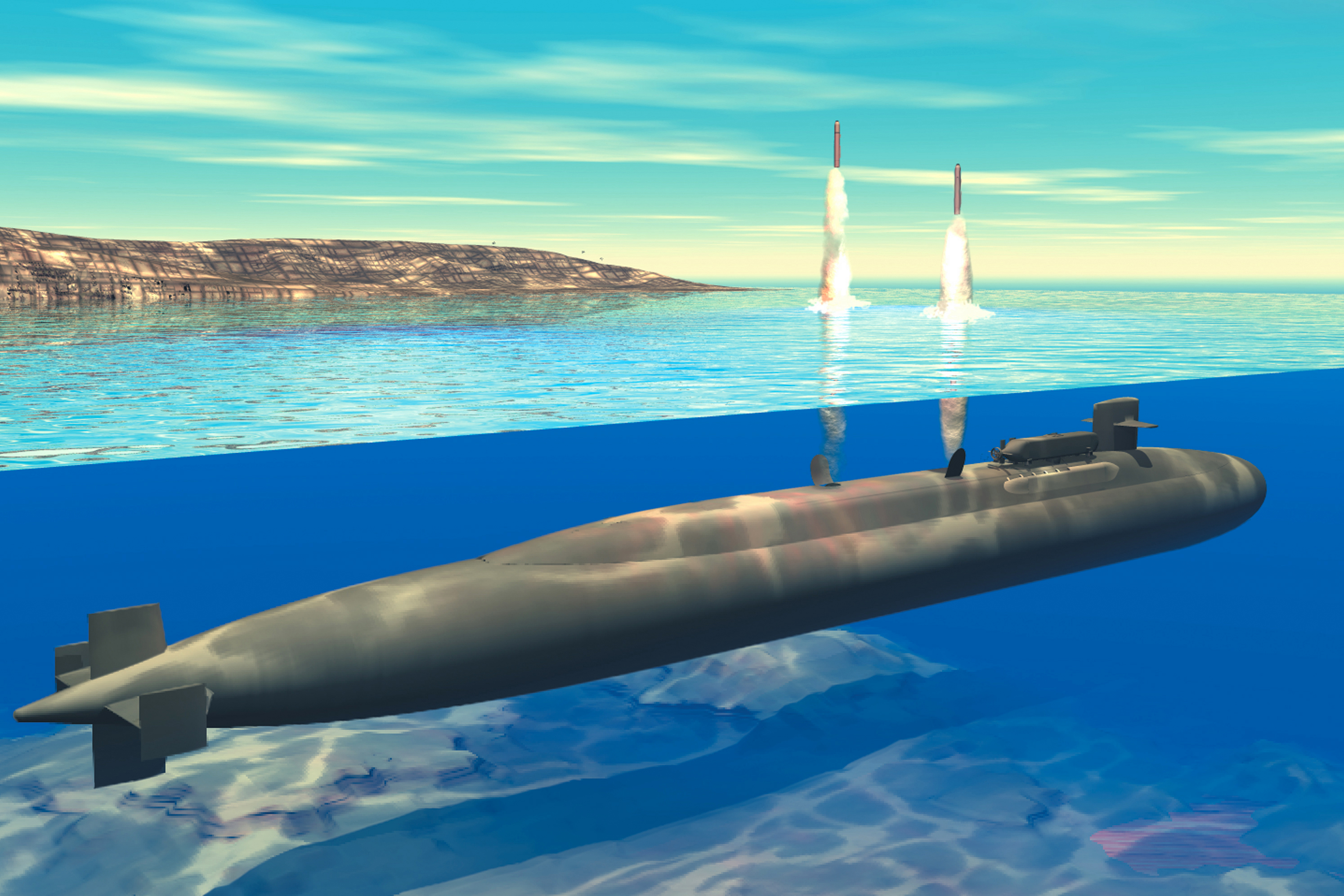
Figure 3: Precisely establishing the position of nuclear submarines prior to missile launches was an early application of long baseline acoustic positioning systems. Covert networks of sea floor transponders could survive and provide a precision navigation capability even after GPS satellites had been knocked out.

By the mid-1960s and possibly earlier, the Soviets were developing underwater navigation systems including seafloor transponders to allow nuclear submarines to operate precisely while staying submerged. Besides navigating through canyons and other difficult underwater terrain, there was also a need to establish the position of the submarine prior to the launch of a nuclear missile (ICBM). In 1981, acoustic positioning was proposed as part of the U.S. military's MX missile system. A network of 150 covert transponder fields was envisioned. Submarines typically are guided by inertial navigation systems, but these dead reckoning systems develop position drift which must be corrected by occasional position fixes from a GNSS system. If the enemy were to knock out the GNSS satellites, the submarine could rely on the covert transponder network to establish its position and program the missile's own inertial navigation system for launch.
