= Short baseline acoustic positioning system =

Class of underwater acoustic positioning systems

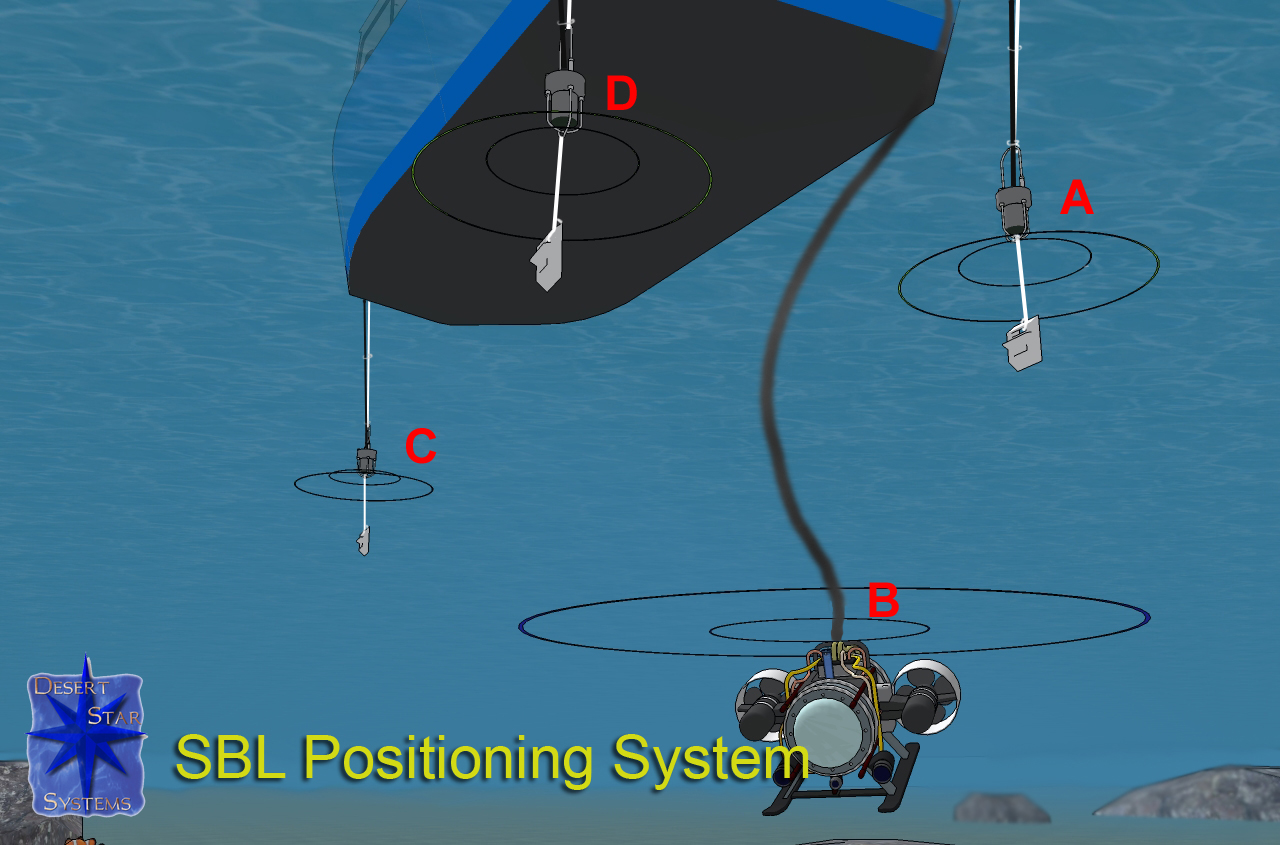
Figure 1: Method of operation of a short baseline (SBL) acoustic positioning system for ROV

A short baseline (SBL) acoustic positioning system is one of three broad classes of underwater acoustic positioning systems that are used to track underwater vehicles and divers. The other two classes are ultra short baseline systems (USBL) and long baseline systems (LBL). Like USBL systems, SBL systems do not require any seafloor mounted transponders or equipment and are thus suitable for tracking underwater targets from boats or ships that are either anchored or under way. However, unlike USBL systems, which offer fixed accuracy, SBL positioning accuracy improves with transducer spacing. Thus, where space permits, such as when operating from larger vessels or a dock, the SBL system can achieve a precision and position robustness that is similar to that of sea floor mounted LBL systems, making the system suitable for high-accuracy survey work. When operating from a smaller vessel where transducer spacing is limited (i.e. when the baseline is short), the SBL system will exhibit reduced precision.

== Operation and performance ==
Short baseline systems determine the position of a tracked target such as a ROV by measuring the target's distance from three or more transducers that are, for example, lowered over the side of the surface vessel from which tracking operations take place. These range measurements, which are often supplemented by depth data from a pressure sensor, are then used to triangulate the position of the target. In figure 1, baseline transducer (A) sends a signal, which is received by a transponder (B) on the tracked target. The transponder replies, and the reply is received by the three baseline transducers (A, C, D). Signal run time measurements now yield the distances B-A, B-C and B-D. The resulting target positions are always relative to the location of the baseline transducers. In cases where tracking is conducted from a moving boat but the target position must be known in earth coordinates such as latitude/longitude or UTM, the SBL positioning system is combined with a GPS receiver and an electronic compass, both mounted on the boat. These instruments determine the location and orientation of the boat, which are combined with the relative position data from the SBL system to establish the position of the tracked target in earth coordinates.

Short baseline systems get their name from the fact that the spacing of the baseline transducers (on a boat for example) is usually much less than the distance to the target, such as a robotic vehicle or diver venturing far from the boat As with any acoustic positioning system, a larger baseline yields better positioning accuracy. SBL systems use this concept to an advantage by adjusting transducer spacing for best results When operating from larger ships, from docks or from the sea ice where greater transducer spacing can be used, SBL systems can yield a positioning accuracy and robustness approaching that of sea-floor mounted LBL systems.

== History ==
SBL systems are found employed in a variety of often specialized applications. Perhaps the first implementation of any underwater acoustic positioning system was a SBL system installed on the U.S. Navy oceanographic vessel USNS Mizar. In 1963, this system guided the bathyscaphe Trieste 1 to the wreck site of the American nuclear submarine USS Thresher. However, performance was still so poor that out of ten search dives by Trieste 1, visual contact was only made once with the wreckage.

The Woods Hole Oceanographic Institution is using a SHARPS SBL system to guide their JASON tethered deep ocean robotic vehicle relative to the MEDEA depressor weight and docking station associated with the vehicle. Rather than tracking both vehicles with a positioning system from the surface which would result in degraded accuracy as the pair's deployment distance, the SBL baseline transducers are mounted on MEDEA. Yielding the position of JASON relative to MEDEA with good accuracy independent of the system's deployment depth. The reported accuracy is 0.09m

SBL systems are also available commercially for positioning of small ROVs and other subsea vehicles and equipment.

== Example ==
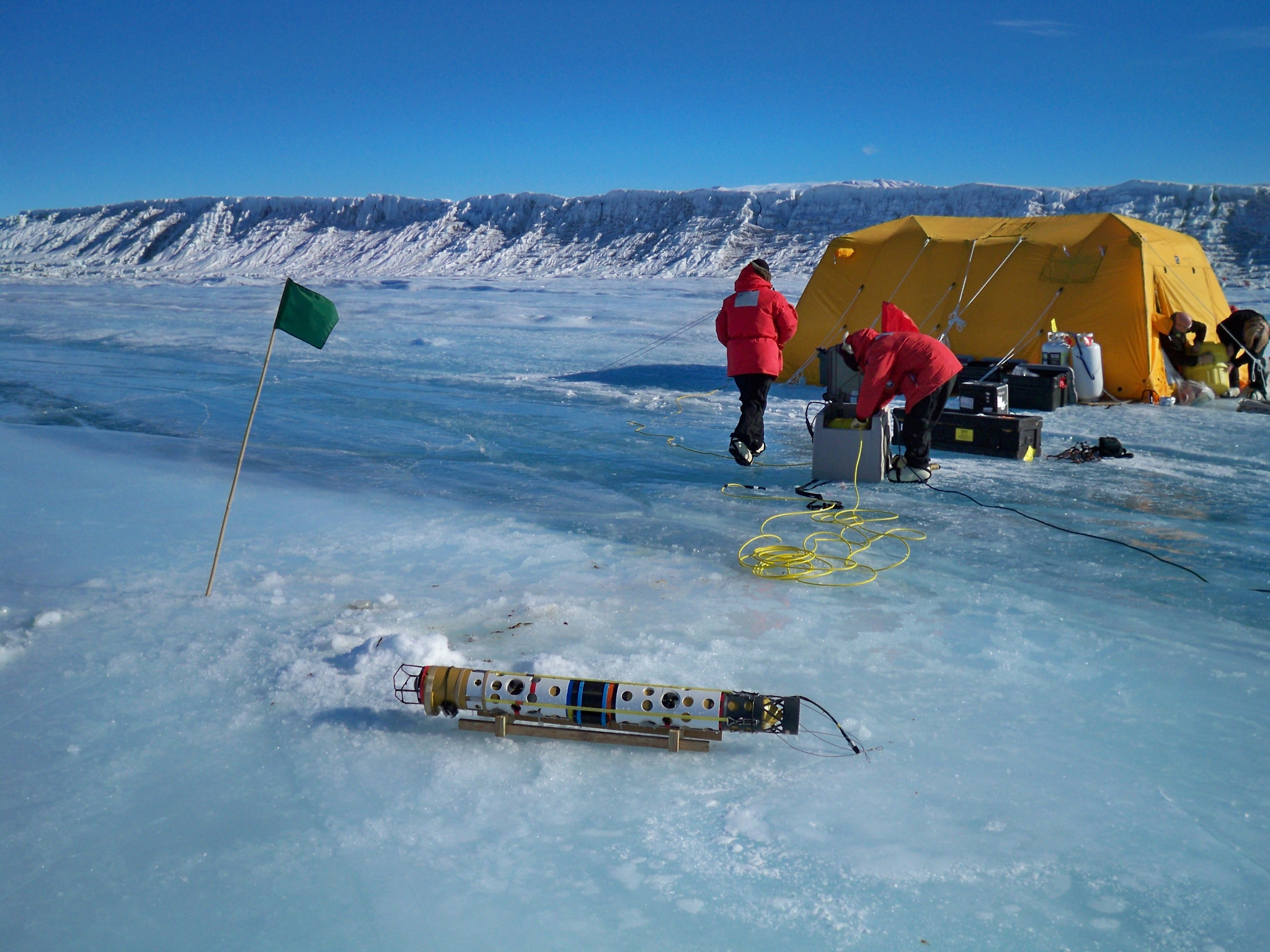
Figure 2: The SCINI ROV next to its dive hole at Heald Island, Antarctica

An example of SBL technology is currently (since 2007) underway in Antarctica, where the Moss Landing Marine Laboratory is using a PILOT SBL system to guide the SCINI remotely operated vehicle. SCINI (figure 2) is a small, torpedo-shaped tethered vehicle (ROV) designed for rapid and uncomplicated deployment and exploration of remote sites around Antarctica, including Heald Island, Cape Evans and Bay of Sails. SCINI system is designed to be compact and light-weight so as to facilitate rapid deployment by helicopter, tracked vehicle and even man-hauled sleds. Once on site, its torpedo shaped body allows it to access the ocean through small (20 cm dia.) holes drilled into the sea ice. The mission's science goals however demand high accuracy in navigation, to support tasks including running 10-m video transects (straight lines), providing precise positions for still images to document the distribution and population density of benthic organisms and marking and re-visiting sites for further investigation.

The SBL navigation system (figure 3) consists of three small, 5 cm diameter sonar baseline transducers (A, B, C) that are linked by cable to a control box (D). A small (13.5 cm L x 4 cm D), cylinder shaped transponder is mounted on the SCINI vehicle. Accuracy is optimized by making use of the flat sea ice to place the baseline transducers well apart; approx. 35m for most SCINI deployments.

Figure 4 reviews SCINI operations guided by the SBL system. Figure 4A is an improvised ROV control room, in this case in a cabin hauled on top of an ice hole at Cape Armitage. From left, the displays are the ROV controls screen (A), the main camera view (B), the navigation screen (C) and the science display (D). The ROV pilot will generally watch the main camera view. He will glance at the navigation screen (C), which shows the current ROV position and track overlaid on a chart, for orientation and to guide the ROV to the location instructed by the scientist. The scientist, shown here seated on the right is provided with the science display (D), which combines the ROV imagery with position, depth and time data in real time. The scientist types written or speaks audible observations into the computer to provide a context for the data, note objects or events of interest or designate the start or conclusion of a video transect (figure 4B).

A typical investigation of a site will span several dives, as tasks such as initial investigation, still image acquisition and video transects are gradually completed. A critical element in these dive series is to show prior-dive search coverage, so that a successive dive can be targeted at a previously unvisited area. This is done by producing a cumulative coverage plot of the dive site (figure 4C). The plot, which is updated after every dive, is displayed as a background map on the navigation screen thus providing guidance for the ongoing dive. It shows the prior ROV tracks with color used to indicate depth. Analysis of the track data displayed here yields the quality of positioning to provide a margin of error for measurements. In this case, the typical precision has been established as 0.54m.

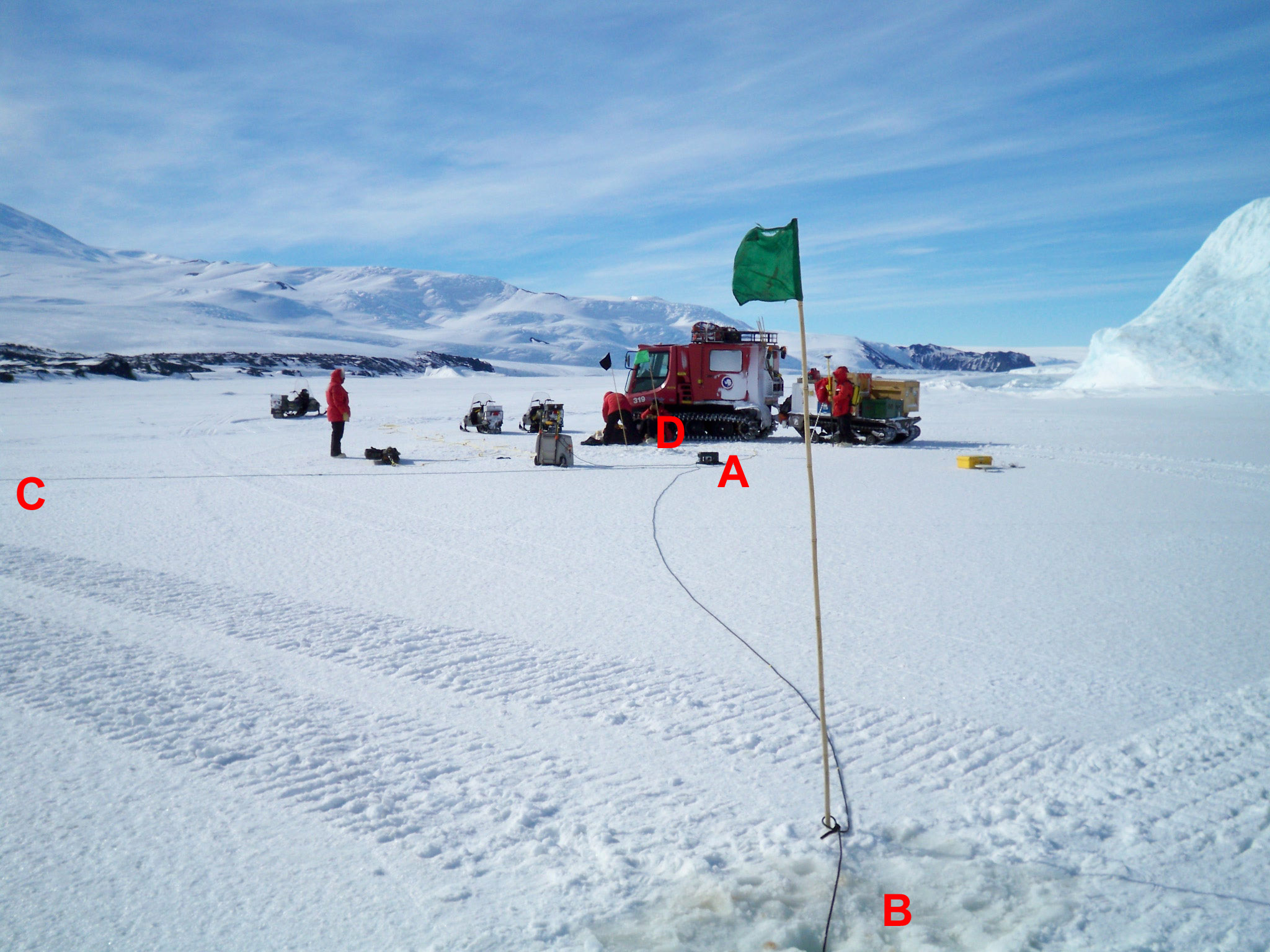
Figure 3: SBL positioning system deployment at Cape Evans. Maximizing the spacing of the baseline sonar transducers (A, B, C) and arranging them in an equilateral triangle yields best accuracy

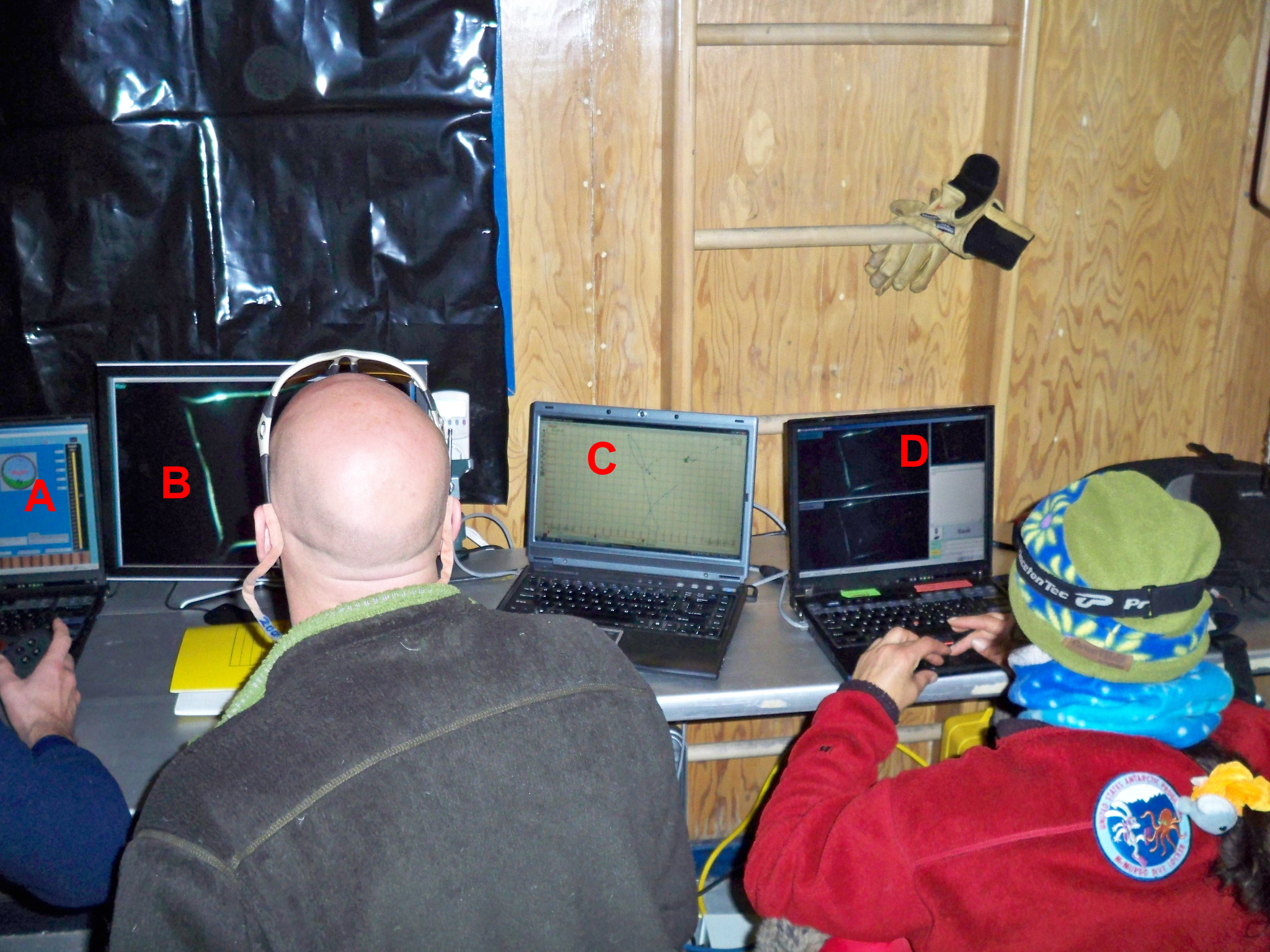
Figure 4A: SCINI control room with four display screens for ROV control (A), main camera view (B), SBL navigation display (C) and image annotation or science screen (D)

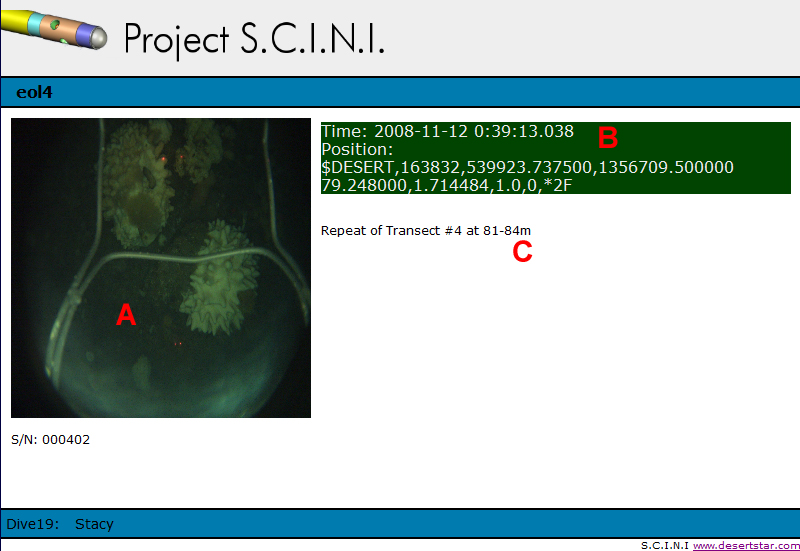
Figure 4B: Imagery, associated position, time and the scientist's observation or statement are combined into a single record

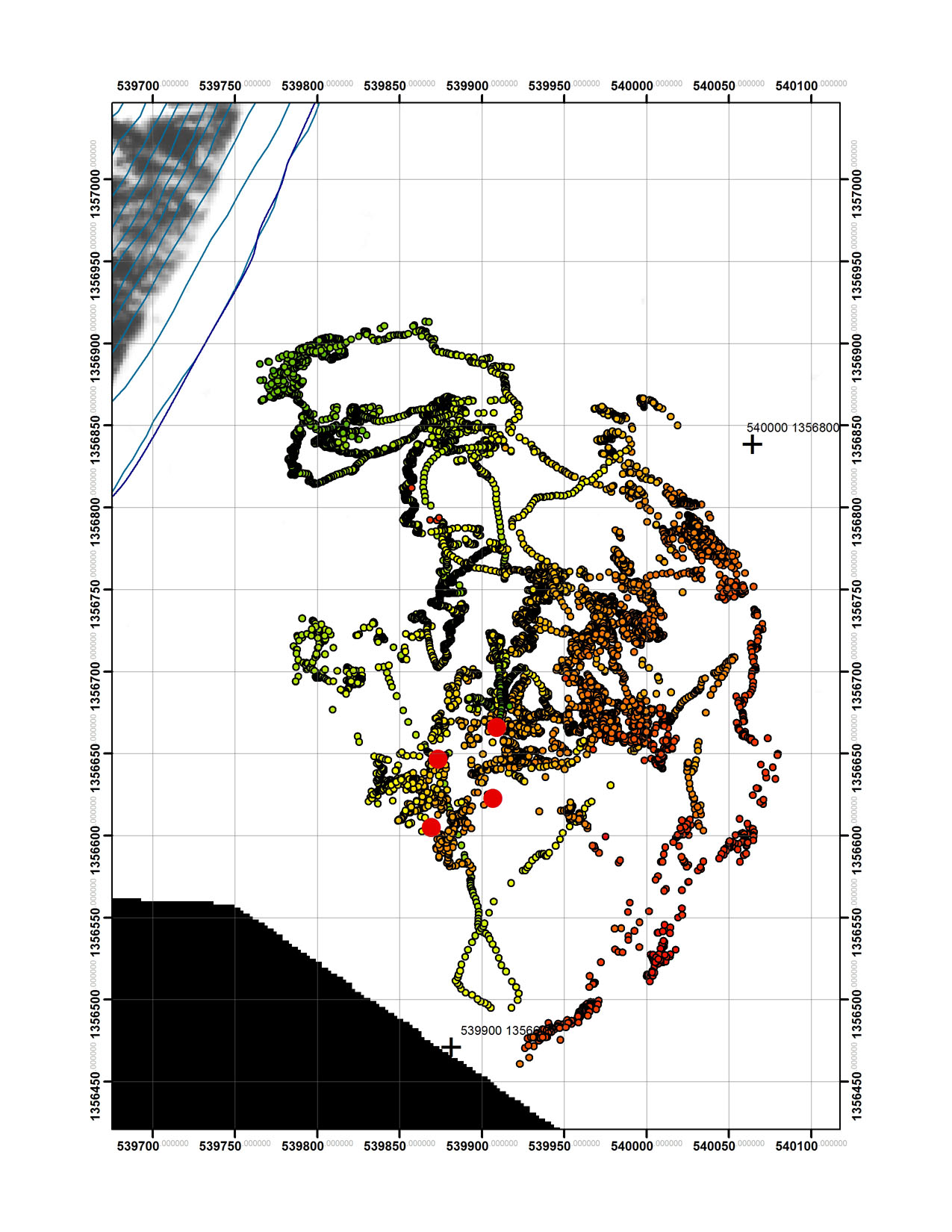
Figure 4C: A site coverage plot of multiple SCINI dives at Cape Armitage. The colored dots are the depth coded position traces of the vehicle
