= Underwater acoustic positioning system =

Sound-based navigation and tracking of vessels

An underwater acoustic positioning system is a system for the tracking and navigation of underwater vehicles or divers by means of acoustic distance and/or direction measurements, and subsequent position triangulation. Underwater acoustic positioning systems are commonly used in a wide variety of underwater work, including oil and gas exploration, ocean sciences, salvage operations, marine archaeology, law enforcement and military activities.

== Method of operation ==
The general method of operation of an acoustic positioning system is described for an example of a long baseline (LBL) positioning system for a ROV

=== Baseline station deployment and survey ===
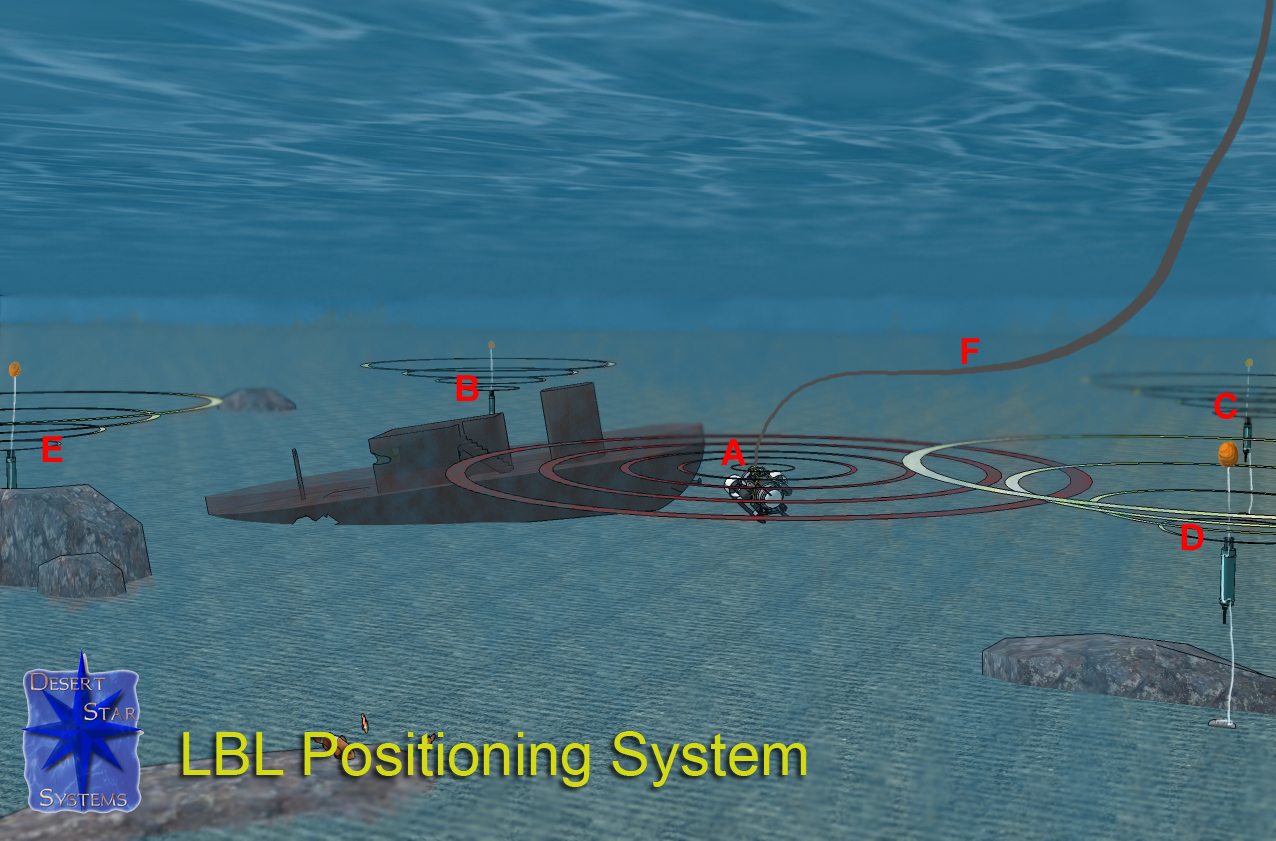
Method of operation of a Long Baseline (LBL) acoustic positioning system for ROV A: interrogator, B, C, D, E: baseline transponders, F: ROV umbilical

Acoustic positioning systems measure positions relative to a framework of baseline stations, which must be deployed prior to operations. In the case of a long-baseline (LBL) system, a set of three or more baseline transponders are deployed on the sea floor. The location of the baseline transponders either relative to each other or in global coordinates must then be measured precisely. Some systems assist this task with an automated acoustic self-survey, and in other cases GPS is used to establish the position of each baseline transponder as it is deployed or after deployment.

=== Tracking or navigation operations ===
Following the baseline deployment and survey, the acoustic positioning system is ready for operations. In the long baseline example an interrogator is mounted on the ROV that is to be tracked. The interrogator transmits an acoustic signal that is received by the baseline transponders. The reply of the baseline transponders is received again at the ROV. The signal time-of-flight or the corresponding distances between interrogator and baseline transponders are transmitted via the ROV umbilical to the surface, where the ROV position is computed and displayed on a tracking screen. The acoustic distance measurements may be augmented by depth sensor data to obtain better positioning accuracy in the three-dimensional underwater space.

Acoustic positioning systems can yield an accuracy of a few centimeters to tens of meters and can be used over operating distance from tens of meters to tens of kilometers. Performance depends strongly on the type and model of the positioning system, its configuration for a particular job, and the characteristics of the underwater acoustic environment at the work site.

== Classes ==
Underwater acoustic positioning systems are generally categorized into three broad types or classes

Long-baseline (LBL) systems, use a sea-floor baseline transponder network. The transponders are typically mounted in the corners of the operations site. LBL systems yield very high accuracy of generally better than 1 m and sometimes as good as 0.01m along with very robust positions This is due to the fact that the transponders are installed in the reference frame of the work site itself (i.e. on the sea floor), the wide transponder spacing results in an ideal geometry for position computations, and the LBL system operates without an acoustic path to the (potentially distant) sea surface.

Ultra-short-baseline (USBL) systems and the related super-short-baseline (SSBL) systems rely on a small (ex. 230 mm across), tightly integrated transducer array that is typically mounted on the bottom end of a strong, rigid transducer pole which is installed either on the side or in some cases on the bottom of a surface vessel. Unlike LBL and SBL systems, which determine position by measuring multiple distances, the USBL transducer array is used to measure the target distance from the transducer pole by using signal run time, and the target direction by measuring the phase shift of the reply signal as seen by the individual elements of the transducer array. The combination of distance and direction fixes the position of the tracked target relative to the surface vessel. Additional sensors including GPS, a gyro or electronic compass and a vertical reference unit are then used to compensate for the changing position and orientation (pitch, roll, bearing) of the surface vessel and its transducer pole. USBL systems offer the advantage of not requiring a sea floor transponder array. The disadvantage is that positioning accuracy and robustness is not as good as for LBL systems. The reason is that the fixed angle resolved by a USBL system translates to a larger position error at greater distance. Also, the multiple sensors needed for the USBL transducer pole position and orientation compensation each introduce additional errors. Finally, the non-uniformity of the underwater acoustic environment cause signal refractions and reflections that have a greater impact on USBL positioning than is the case for the LBL geometry.

Short-baseline (SBL) systems use a baseline consisting of three or more individual sonar transducers that are connected by wire to a central control box. Accuracy depends on transducer spacing and mounting method. When a wider spacing is employed as when working from a large working barge or when operating from a dock or other fixed platform, the performance can be similar to LBL systems. When operating from a small boat where transducer spacing is tight, accuracy is reduced. Like USBL systems, SBL systems are frequently mounted on boats and ships, but specialized modes of deployment are common too. For example, the Woods Hole Oceanographic Institution uses a SBL system to position the Jason deep-ocean ROV relative to its associated MEDEA depressor weight with a reported accuracy of 9 cm

GPS intelligent buoys (GIB) systems are inverted LBL devices where the transducers are replaced by floating buoys, self-positioned by GPS. The tracked position is calculated in realtime at the surface from the Time-Of-Arrival (TOAs) of the acoustic signals sent by the underwater device, and acquired by the buoys. Such configuration allow fast, calibration-free deployment with an accuracy similar to LBL systems. At the opposite of LBL, SBL or USBL systems, GIB systems use one-way acoustic signals from the emitter to the buoys, making it less sensitive to surface or wall reflections. GIB systems are used to track AUVs, torpedoes, or divers, may be used to localize airplane black-boxes, and may be used to determine the impact coordinates of inert or live weapons for weapon testing and training purposes

== History and examples of use ==
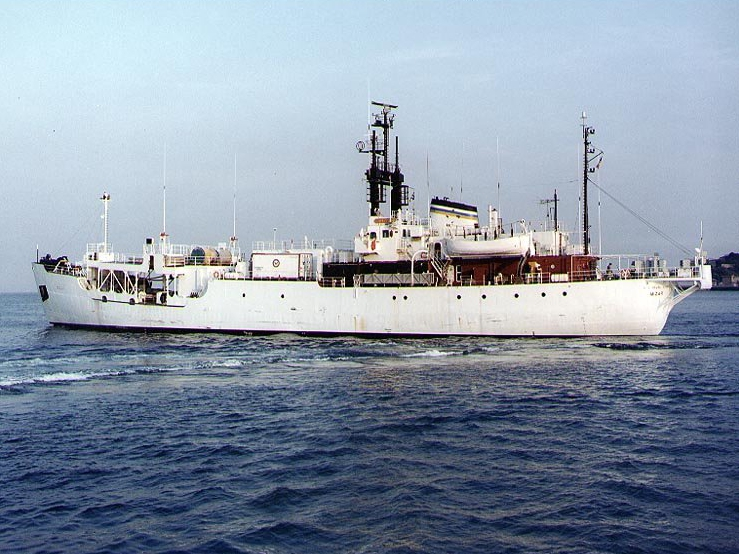
An acoustic short baseline (SBL) positioning system was installed on the USNS Mizar during the search dives to the wreckage of the submarine USS Thresher

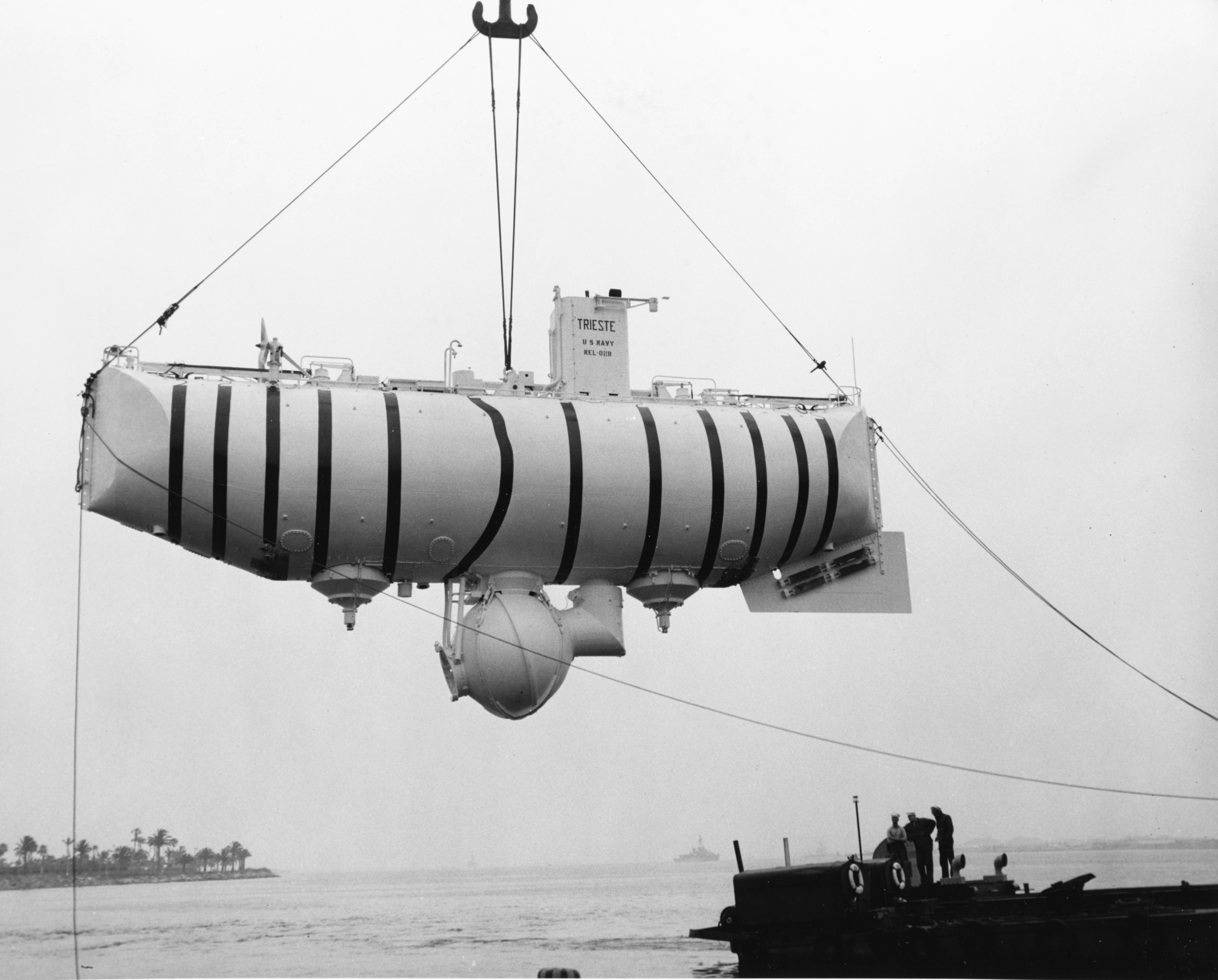
The bathyscaphe Trieste was guided by its acoustic positioning system to the Thresher

An early use of underwater acoustic positioning systems, credited with initiating the modern day development of these systems, involved the loss of the American nuclear submarine USS Thresher on 10 April 1963 in a water depth of 2560m. An acoustic short baseline (SBL) positioning system was installed on the oceanographic vessel USNS Mizar. This system was used to guide the bathyscaphe Trieste 1 to the wreck site. Yet, the state of the technology was still so poor that out of ten search dives by Trieste 1, visual contact was only made once with the wreckage. Acoustic positioning was again used in 1966, to aid in the search and subsequent recovery of a nuclear bomb lost during the crash of a B-52 bomber at sea off the coast of Spain.

In the 1970s, oil and gas exploration in deeper waters required improved underwater positioning accuracy to place drill strings into the exact position referenced earlier thorough seismic instrumentation and to perform other underwater construction tasks.

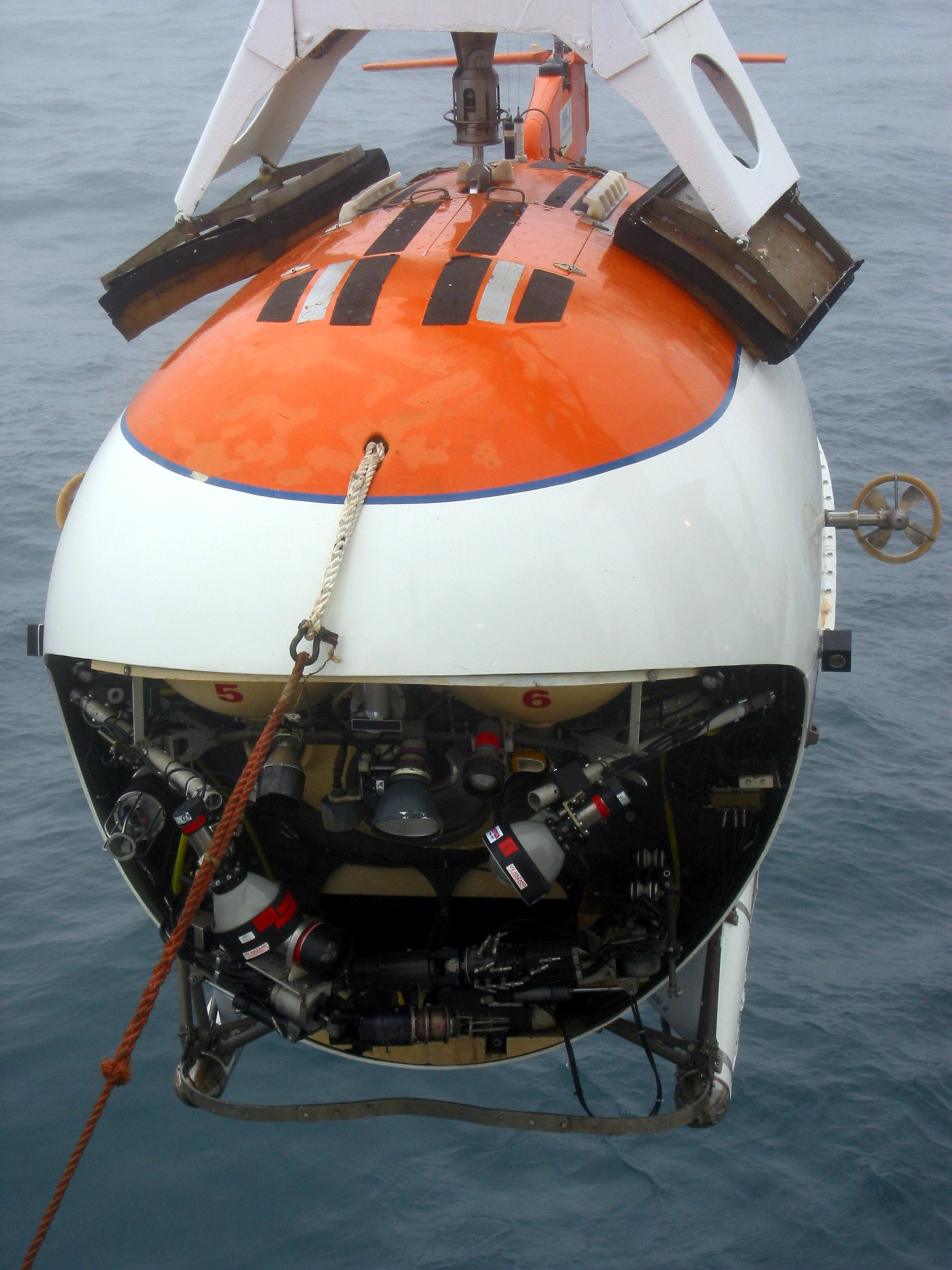
The Russian deep sea submersibles MIR-1 and MIR-2 searched the wreck site of the Japanese submarine I-52 in 1998. A LBL positioning system was used to guide and document the progressing search over multiple dives

The technology was also used in other applications. In 1998, salvager Paul Tidwell's company Cape Verde Explorations led an expedition to the wreck site of the World War 2 Japanese cargo submarine I-52 in the mid-Atlantic. Resting at a depth of 5240 meters, it had been located and then identified using side scan sonar and an underwater tow sled in 1995. War-time records indicated the I-52 was bound for Germany, with a cargo including 146 gold bars in 49 metal boxes. Tidwell's company had hired the Russian oceanographic vessel, the Akademik Mstislav Keldysh with its two crewed deep-ocean submersibles MIR-1 and MIR-2. In order to facilitate precise navigation across the debris field and assure a thorough search, MIR-1 deployed a long baseline transponder network on the first dive. Over a series of seven dives by each submersible, the debris field was progressively searched. The LBL positioning record indicated the broadening search coverage after each dive, allowing the team to concentrate on yet unsearched areas during the following dive. No gold was found, but the positioning system had documented the extent of the search.

In recent years, several trends in underwater acoustic positioning have emerged. One is the introduction of compound systems such the combination of LBL and USBL in a so-called LUSBL configuration to enhance performance. These systems are generally used in the offshore oil & gas sector and other high-end applications. Another trend is the introduction of compact, task optimized systems for a variety of specialized purposes. For example, the California Department of Fish and Game commissioned a system, which continually measures the opening area and geometry of a fish sampling net during a trawl. That information helps the department improve the accuracy of their fish stock assessments in the Sacramento River Delta.

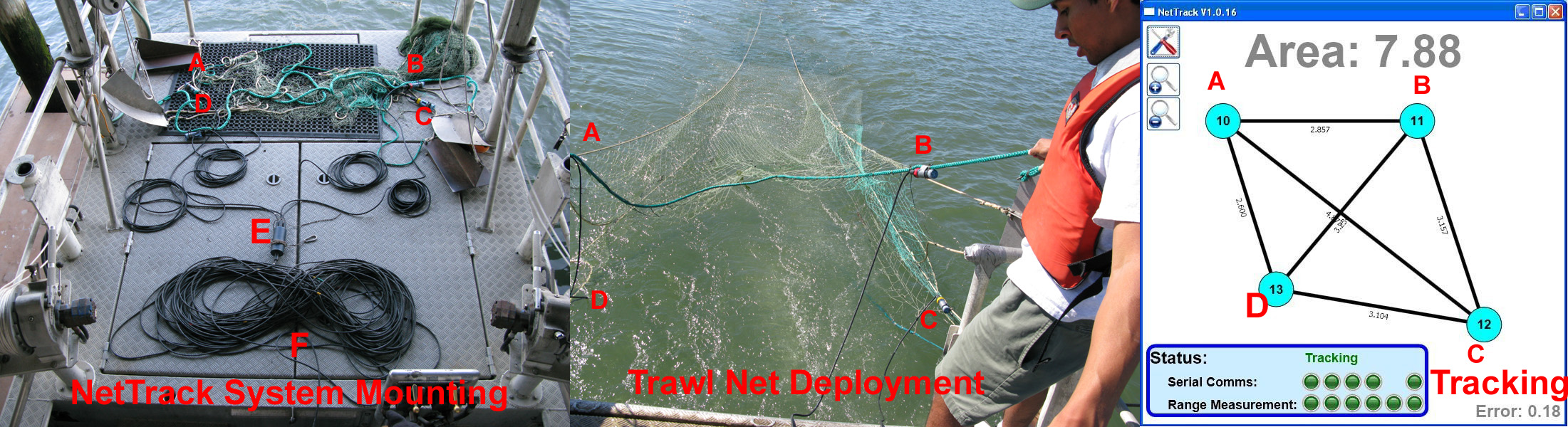
NetTrack is an example of a special-purpose underwater acoustic positioning system of the SBL type, designed to measure the opening geometry and area of a trawl net for accurate fish stock assessment purposes. Left: Four small responders (A, B, C, D) are mounted in the corners of the trawl net opening and wired via junction bottle (E) and umbilical (F) to a surface station computer. Center: The net is deployed. Right: The surface station computer sends instructions to one responder (ex. A) to transmit, while instructing the other responders (ex. B, C, D) to receive. By this method all six distances (A–B, A–C, A–D, B–C, B–D, C–D) are measured. The four sides of the opening and one diagonal are used to triangulate the trawl net opening geometry and area. The second diagonal is available to compute a measurement error metric for data quality verification.

Water-proof smart devices like Apple Watch Ultra and Garmin Descent have been introduced to function as dive computers. These devices have a depth gauge sensor, provide a dive profile, and safety alerts for fast ascents and decompression stops using the depth data. In 2023, University of Washington researchers demonstrated a fourth class of 3D underwater positioning for these smart devices that does not require infrastructure support like buoys. Instead they use distributed localization techniques by computing the pairwise distances between a network of diver devices to determine the shape of the resulting network topology. Combining this with depth sensor data from these devices, the lead diver can then compute the relative 3D positions of all the other diver devices.
