= French submarine Eurydice (S644) =

French submarine, 1964–1970

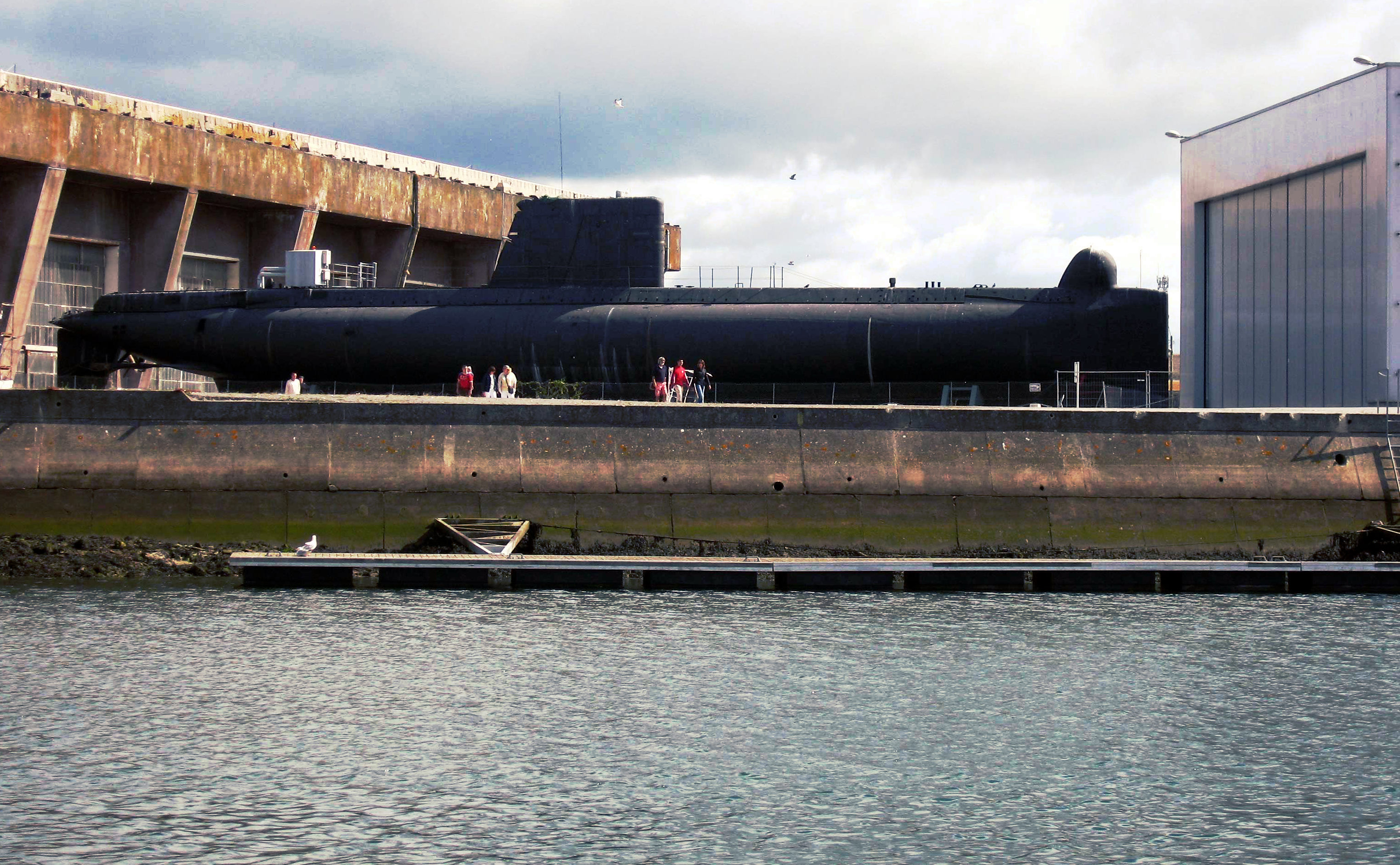
- Flore, sister ship of Eurydice

History

France
- Name: Eurydice
- Namesake: Eurydice, a character in Greek mythology
- Launched: 19 June 1962
- Commissioned: 26 September 1964
- Home port: Saint-Tropez, France
- Identification: S644
- Fate: Sunk 4 March 1970

General characteristics
- Class & type: Daphné-class submarine
- Displacement: 869 tonnes surfaced; 1,043 tonnes submerged
- Length: 57.75 m (189 ft 6 in)
- Beam: 6.74 m (22 ft 1 in)
- Draught: 5.25 m (17 ft 3 in)
- Propulsion: Diesel-electric, two shafts, 1,600 shp (1,200 kW)
- Speed: Submerged: 16 knots (30 km/h; 18 mph); Snorkelling: 8 knots (15 km/h; 9.2 mph); Surfaced: 12 knots (22 km/h; 14 mph)
- Range: Surfaced: 10,000 nmi (19,000 km; 12,000 mi) at 7 knots (13 km/h; 8.1 mph)
- Endurance: 30 days
- Test depth: 300 m (980 ft)

Eurydice was a French submarine, one of eleven of the Daphné class.

On 4 March 1970, while Eurydice was submerged under calm seas off Cape Camarat in the Mediterranean Sea 35 nautical miles (65 km; 40 mi) east of Toulon, France, a geophysical laboratory picked up the shock waves of an underwater explosion. French and Italian search teams found an oil slick and a few bits of debris, including a part that bore the name Eurydice. The search for the missing sub continued for nearly seven weeks. The United States Navy oceanographic research ship USNS Mizar (T-AGOR-11) also took part in the search and on 22 April 1970 discovered several large pieces of wreckage off Cape Camarat near Saint-Tropez at depths ranging from 600 to 1,100 metres (2,000 to 3,600 ft).

The cause of the explosion was never determined. All 57 crew were lost. A French inquiry commission reported that a Tunisian ship, the Tabarka, had marks on its hull suggesting a collision with an underwater object in the area where Eurydice was lost. This occurred in March 1970. The Tabarka bore marks on its starboard side and under the waterline, including parallel scratches and traces of paint and metal that did not belong to the Tabarka. However, a spokesman for the commission stated that while the Tabarka had hit a metal object, it would be going too far to say there had been a collision between the Eurydice and the Tabarka.

== See also ==
- List of submarines of France
