= USNS Mizar =

Cargo ship of the United States Navy (1957–1990)

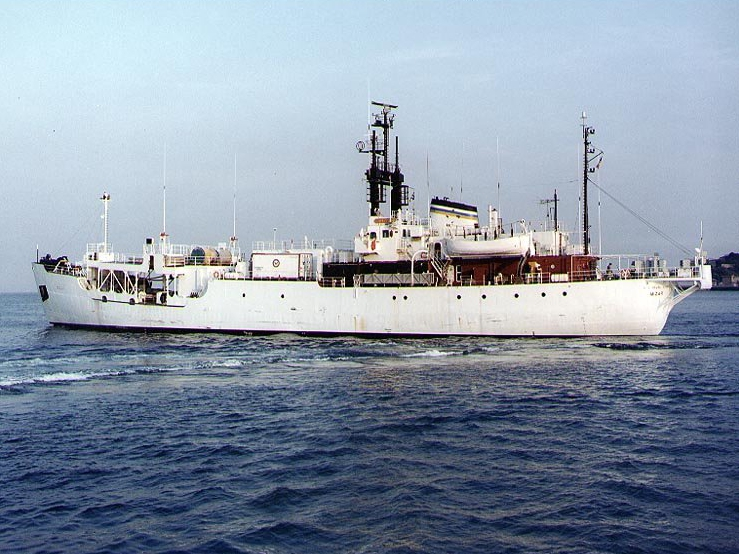

History

United States
- Name: Mizar
- Namesake: The star Mizar in the constellation Ursa Major
- Builder: Avondale Marine Ways, Inc.
- Laid down: 1 January 1957
- Launched: 7 October 1957
- In service: 7 March 1958
- Stricken: 16 February 1990
- Identification: IMO number: 8834873
- Fate: Sold for scrap

General characteristics As AGOR-11
- Displacement: 3,886t loaded; 2,036t light
- Length: 266 ft 2 in (81.13 m) LOA; 250 ft (76 m) Design waterline (DWL)
- Beam: 51 ft 6 in (15.70 m)
- Draft: 17 ft 6 in (5.33 m); 20 ft (6.1 m) to hydrophones 2 ft 6 in (0.76 m) below keel
- Propulsion: 2 X diesels, 1,600 hp each; 2 X propulsion motors 27 hp at 150 rpm; 2 X 4 blade propellers
- Speed: 12 kn (14 mph; 22 km/h)
- Range: 20,000 nmi (23,000 mi; 37,000 km)
- Endurance: 60 days
- Crew: 11 officers, 30 crew (civil service marine personnel); 19 scientific personnel (accommodations for)
- Notes: Double hull, ice strengthened, ice breaker bow

USNS Mizar (MA-48/T-AGOR-11/T-AK-272) was a vessel of the United States Navy. She was named after the star Mizar.

== Cargo ship ==
Mizar was built as a small ice-strengthened, double hull, cargo ship of the Eltanin class on a Maritime Administration type (C1-ME2-13a) hull, by Avondale Marine Ways, Inc. from January 1957. She entered service on March 7, 1958, and served as part of the Military Sea Transportation Service (MSTS), working around Canada and Greenland, with a single voyage to Antarctica in 1961.

== Naval Research Laboratory ==
The loss of the USS Thresher (SSN-593) on April 10, 1963, and problems handling heavy search equipment over the side from James M. Gilliss in 1963 drove the Naval Research Laboratory (NRL) requirement for a larger, more capable ship than the usual oceanographic research type. A search for a candidate ship, capable of being modified for an inboard center well, led to selection of Mizar in late 1963.

In 1964 Mizar's successful search for the sunken submarine, before modification for the desired center well, further demonstrated the need for a sheltered work space with heavy lift and towing capability.

=== Center well ===
NRL's previous vessel with a center well, USS Hunting, provided experience and some problems to avoid in the Mizar design. The two major problems with that installation were wave action in the well that damaged the bulkheads until reinforced and air pressure caused by wave action in the well that forced the deck doors off their tracks. The location of the 34 ft (10.4 m) number two hatch straddling the ship's center section made a center well through even the double bottom feasible. A well 23 ft (7.0 m) long and 10 ft (3.0 m) wide with curved fore and aft ends to reduce wave pounding within was installed. The keel level opening was reduced to one of 21 ft (6.4 m) long and 8 ft (2.4 m) wide. A flush mounted, water tight hydraulic door of two parts, one fore and one aft, closed the well at the main deck level. Three 24 in (61.0 cm) diameter cable sheaves installed in a carriage, within which towed devices would be contained for lowering and raising, and extending below the keel allowed towing of heavy equipment without exposure on open decks. The system had a capacity of 12 tons. Large "breather" ducts from the well relieved air pressure caused by wave action within when the doors were closed. All was enclosed by a housing allowing all weather protection for operators. Mizar went into the Philadelphia Naval Shipyard in late 1965 with the installation of the well being a priority.

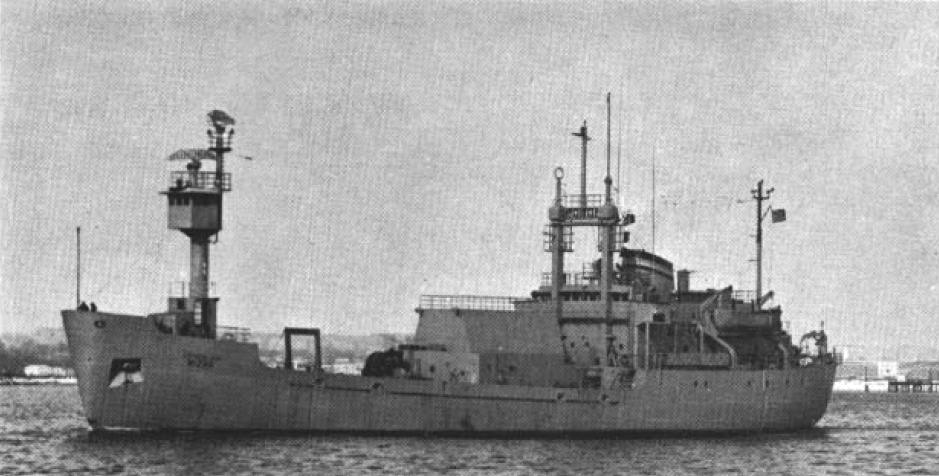
Mizar circa 1966 with ice conning tower.

On April 15, 1964 Mizar was reclassified AGOR-11, designed for deep oceanographic search and research, and to be operated by MSTS for NRL. The ship was fitted with a deepsea vehicle (fish), equipped with strobe lights, cameras, sonar, and magnetometer. Her major tasks were to be ocean floor study and service as a floating base for underwater acoustic, chemical, and biological research. The search for Thresher had paused with advent of bad weather in September 1963. Mizar was assigned to the successor search task group, TG 168.1, when it formed May 18, 1974. Mizar's "fish" located the wreckage of the submarine within a few hours of searching. (Note: See Table 1 on page 3 of Bundage, NRL's Deep Sea Floor Search Era for mission list.)

=== Acoustic navigation system ===
The only means of subsurface navigation locating a search vehicle or other sensors relative to the ship and bottom is by acoustic navigation. Towed deep vehicles may be half a mile from the towing ship and respond to the ship's movements as much as half an hour after that movement. A capability developed at the University of Washington Applied Physics Laboratory was implemented for Mizar. The system, an early implementation of a short baseline acoustic system, is composed of a triangular array of hydrophones on the ship's hull, a transponder on the towed vehicle with an acoustic pulse triggered by a signal over the towing cable, and a sea floor transponder triggered by an acoustic signal from the ship. By using travel times of the signals distances can be computed. A response from the vehicle can be computed for relative position with regard to the ship and that from the bottom transponder is used to find its relative position. The towed vehicles relative position to the ship and bottom is then computed. (Note: Acoustic navigation systems became standard practice in survey and undersea engineering applications. See Underwater acoustic positioning system for different modes and applications.)

=== Research ===
The ship was fitted to perform extensively in ocean science and technology with acoustics an important specialty. Mizar supported scientists from three NRL divisions. The Acoustics Division supported undersea surveillance, fleet sonar systems and studied undersea sound propagation. The Ocean Sciences Division worked in the classical oceanography fields of chemical, physical and biological oceanography and atmospheric studies. Research and development regarding materials and ocean engineering and the ship's searches were under the Ocean Technology Division.

As an example of extensive acoustic research with general oceanographic observations included was the ship's work in Operation NORLANT, an acoustic propagation and noise experiment that involved aircraft as well as NRL ships Mizar and Hayes and the Norwegian research vessel Sverdrup in the Greenland, Norwegian and Barents seas. In one instance Mizar penetrated the ice pack while Hayes remained in the open sea. The closure of the ice and mechanical problems led to Mizar becoming stuck in the ice pack along with her icebreaker escort USCGC Edisto which also suffered from mechanical problems. Both were freed by USCGC Southwind after some days.

One of the NRL developments deployed on Mizar was the Light Behind Camera (LIBEC) that extended the coverage of deep sea cameras significantly. That system was used to photograph portions of the Mid-Atlantic Ridge during Project FAMOUS. (Note: See diagram of LIBEC in reference.)

=== Searches ===
Often more public attention was drawn to the ship's searches for sunken ships than to routine research.

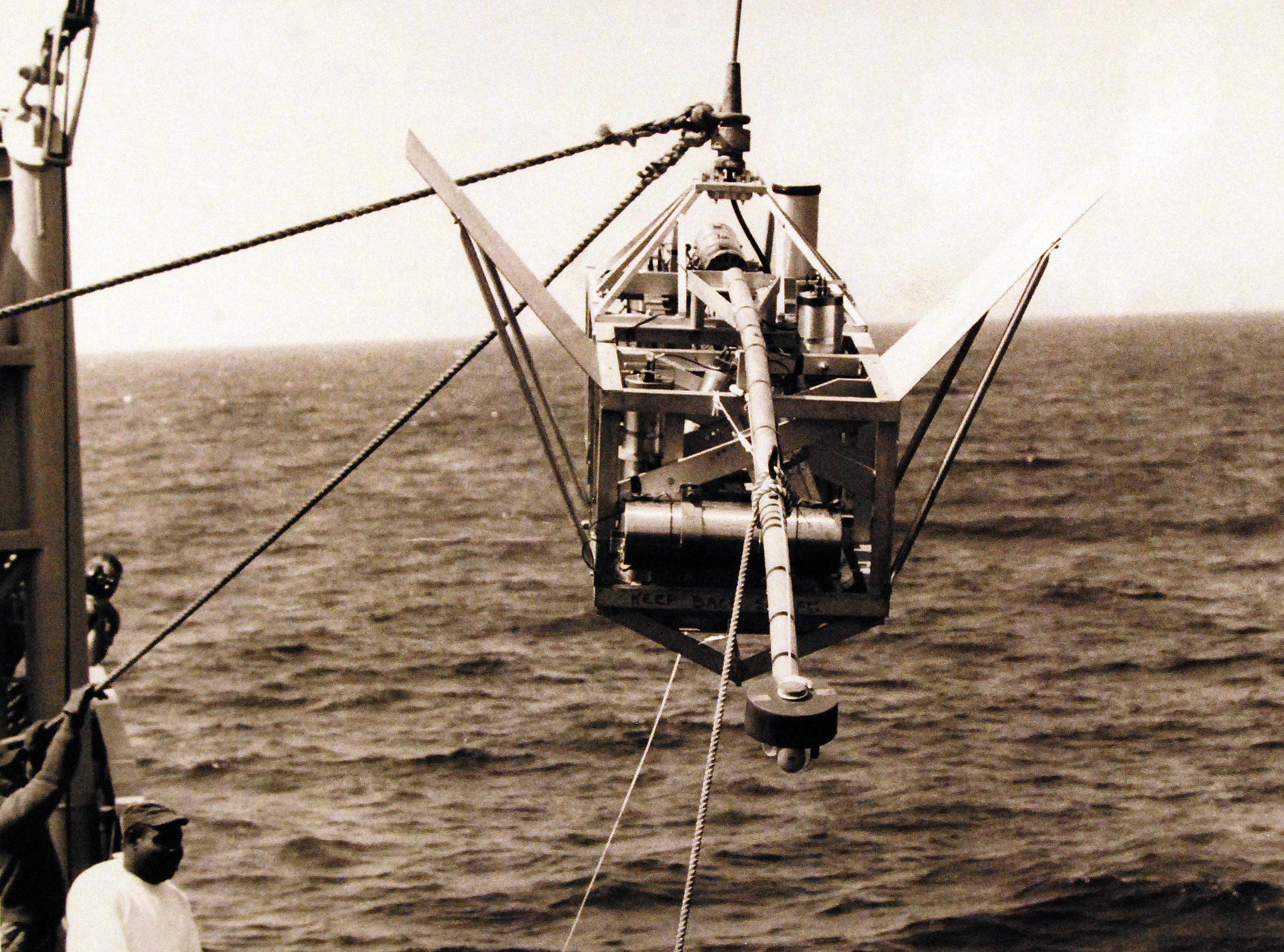
Mizar's deep towed vehicle.

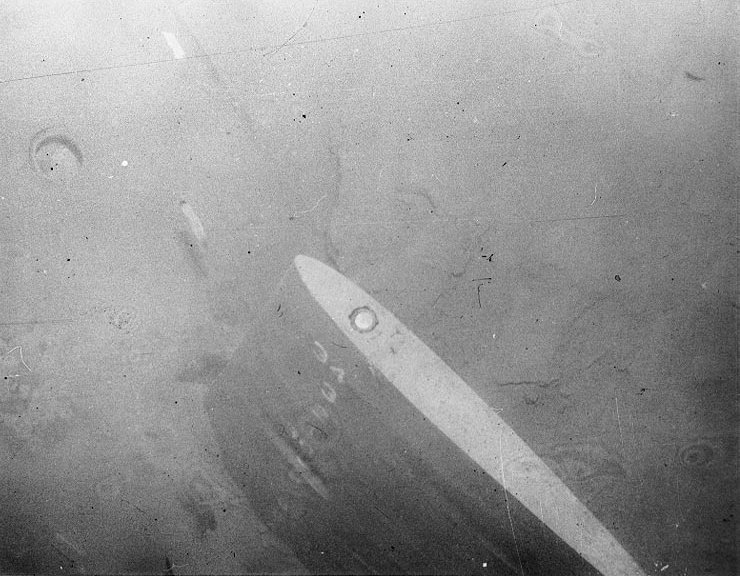
Overhead view of Thresher's upper rudder photographed from Mizar's deep towed vehicle.

- Mizar took part in the search operations for Thresher, the Palomares Incident in which nuclear weapons were lost off Palomares, Spain.
- The ship was engaged in the extended search for USS Scorpion (SSN-589), which was found in October, 1968.
- She also took part in searches for foreign wrecks, including Eurydice.
- In 1969 Mizar was called on to locate the Woods Hole Oceanographic Institute deep submersible Alvin, which had sunk in 5,000 ft (1,524.0 m). Mizar lifted the submersible to shallow water.
- Mizar was not involved, despite speculation, in the search for the Soviet submarines K-129 as the ship was well known to the Soviets and could not operate clandestinely.

Addition of water sampling capability to the search vehicle allowed environmental monitoring as well as location and photography. One example is the ship's monitoring of the scuttled, nerve agent laden, LeBaron Russell Briggs five times between 1970 and 1974. The entire hulk could be photographed and water samples taken close to its deck.

== Assignment to undersea surveillance ==
The Naval Research Laboratory was forced by increasing ship costs to choose between Mizar and the newer Hayes and chose to retain Hayes. (Note: See Relative Capabilities of USNS Hayes and USNS Mizar for Meeting NRL Shipboard Requirements for details on both ships.]) In 1975 Mizar came under the technical control of the Naval Electronic Systems Command (NAVELEX) to become part of the "Caesar fleet" supporting the Sound Surveillance System (SOSUS) installation under the unclassified name Project Caesar. A footnote to a table of ships in The Federal Ocean Program dated April 1974 noted that Mizar was funded and operated by NAVELEX and no longer was funded as an oceanographic ship.

The ship was assigned to Military Sealift Command Pacific in 1975 and underwent another major modification in 1980. As of 1979 Mizar was the most recently built ship of the five ships directly assigned to Project Caesar.

== Disposal ==
Mizar was withdrawn from active service entering the James River National Defense Reserve Fleet on December 17, 1989. The ship was withdrawn October 24, 1991 for stripping before returning December 18 awaiting disposal. Bay Bridge Enterprises, LLC of Chesapeake, Virginia was awarded a $243,900 contract for the dismantling and recycling of Mizar on 21 July 2005.

== Bibliography ==
- Bundage, Walter (November 29, 1988). NRL's Deep Sea Floor Search Era (Report). p. 48.
- Jones, W. L. (September 17, 1970). USNS Mizar 1979. Washington, D.C.: Naval Research Laboratory.
