= Reef Life Survey =

Marine life monitoring programme based in Hobart, Tasmania

- Abbreviation: RLS
- Purpose: Marine life monitoring programme
- Location: Hobart
- Region served: Tasmania
- Website: reeflifesurvey.com

Reef Life Survey is a marine life monitoring programme based in Hobart, Tasmania. It is international in scope, but predominantly Australian, as a large proportion of the volunteers are Australian. Most of the surveys are done by volunteer recreational divers, collecting biodiversity data for marine conservation. The database is available to marine ecology researchers, and is used by several marine protected area managements in Australia, New Zealand, American Samoa and the eastern Pacific.

== Function ==
Reef Life Survey provides data to improve biodiversity conservation and the sustainable management of marine resources. They collect and curate biodiversity information at spatial and temporal scales beyond those possible by most scientific dive teams which have to work with limited resources, by using volunteer recreational divers trained in the RLS survey procedures. The University of Tasmania houses and manages the RLS database, and the data is freely available to the public for non-profit purposes through public outputs, including their website.

== History ==
Reef Life Survey was started by researchers at the University of Tasmania and initially funded by the Commonwealth Environment Research Facilities (CERF) Program. This program is the core activity of the Reef Life Survey Foundation Incorporated – a not for profit Australian organisation.

== Personnel ==
Reef Life Survey includes a volunteer network of recreational scuba divers, trained in the relevant skills, and an Advisory Committee. The advisory committee is made up of managers and scientists who use the collected data, and representatives of the recreational diver network.

== Procedures ==
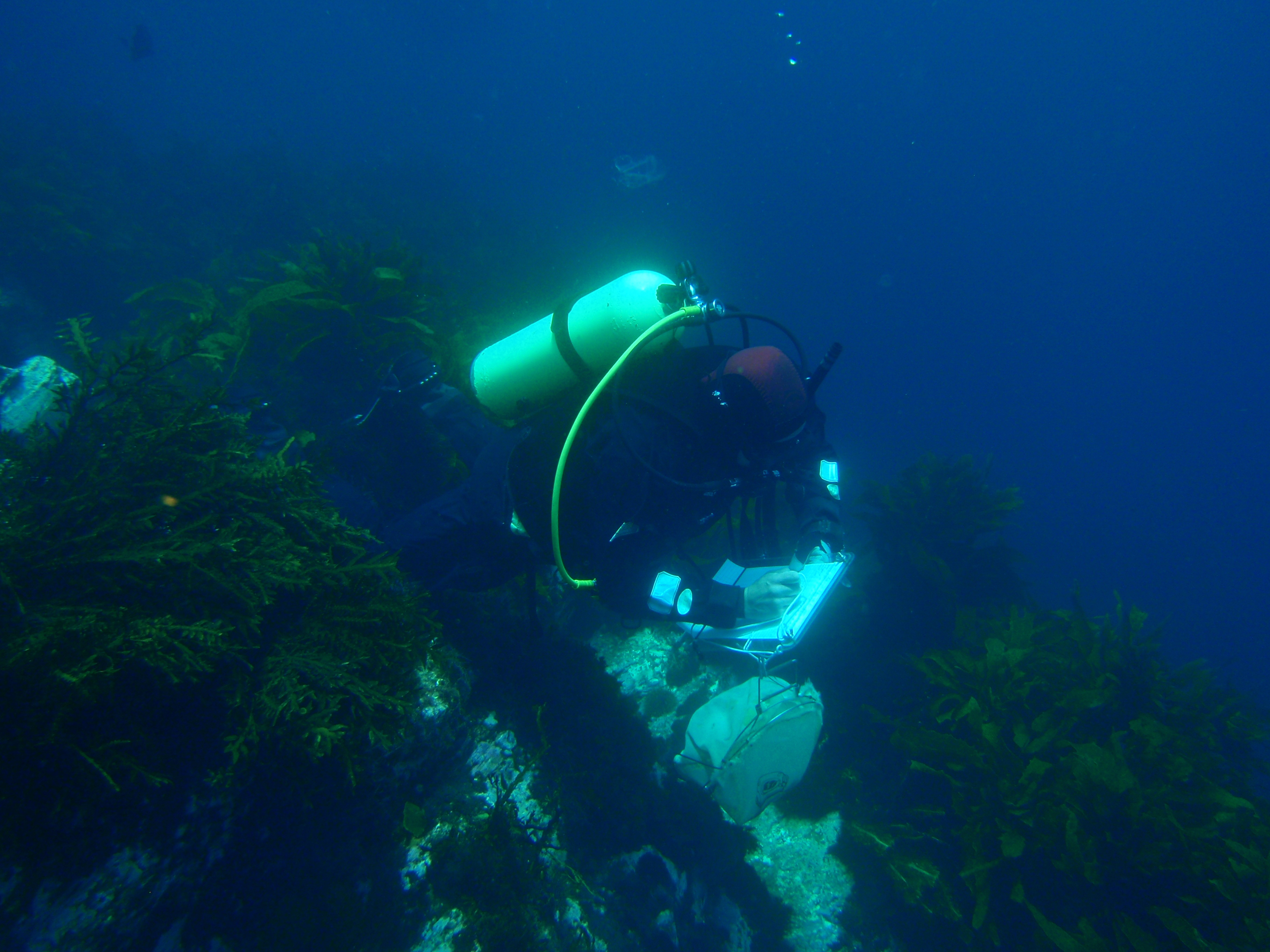
Diver swimming a transect for Reef Life Survey

Standard survey procedures are used matched to a variety of habitat topographies, and using simple equipment - waterproof clipboard with records sheet, underwater camera, and 50m surveyor's tape measure. The surveys are typically repeated at irregular intervals at listed sites, identified by GPS location, transect depth and direction, and are usually conducted as a pair of transects in opposite directions from the nominal position, at approximately constant depth. Data collected includes fish counts by visual census in a 5m x 5m corridor on both sides of the transect line (Method 1), mobile invertebrate counts in a 1m corridor on both sides of the line (Method 2), and photo-quadrats at 2.5m intervals along the 50m transect line. Manufactured debris may also be recorded. Off transect observations of interest are recorded separately (Method 0). Numbers and size class are recorded for fish, just numbers for most invertebrates.

== Data ==
Since 2006, divers have collected data for RLS from over 44 countries. As of September 2015, more than 4500 species have been recorded from over 7000 surveys.

== Expeditions ==
A circumnavigation of Australia by volunteer citizen scientists aboard the sailing catamaran Reef Dragon left Port Davey, Tasmania, on February 16, 2013, on an counterclockwise journey around the continent of Australia and ended in February 2014 in Prince of Wales Bay, Hobart. During the voyage a marine baseline of reef biodiversity for the new Coral Sea Commonwealth Marine Reserve network was established.

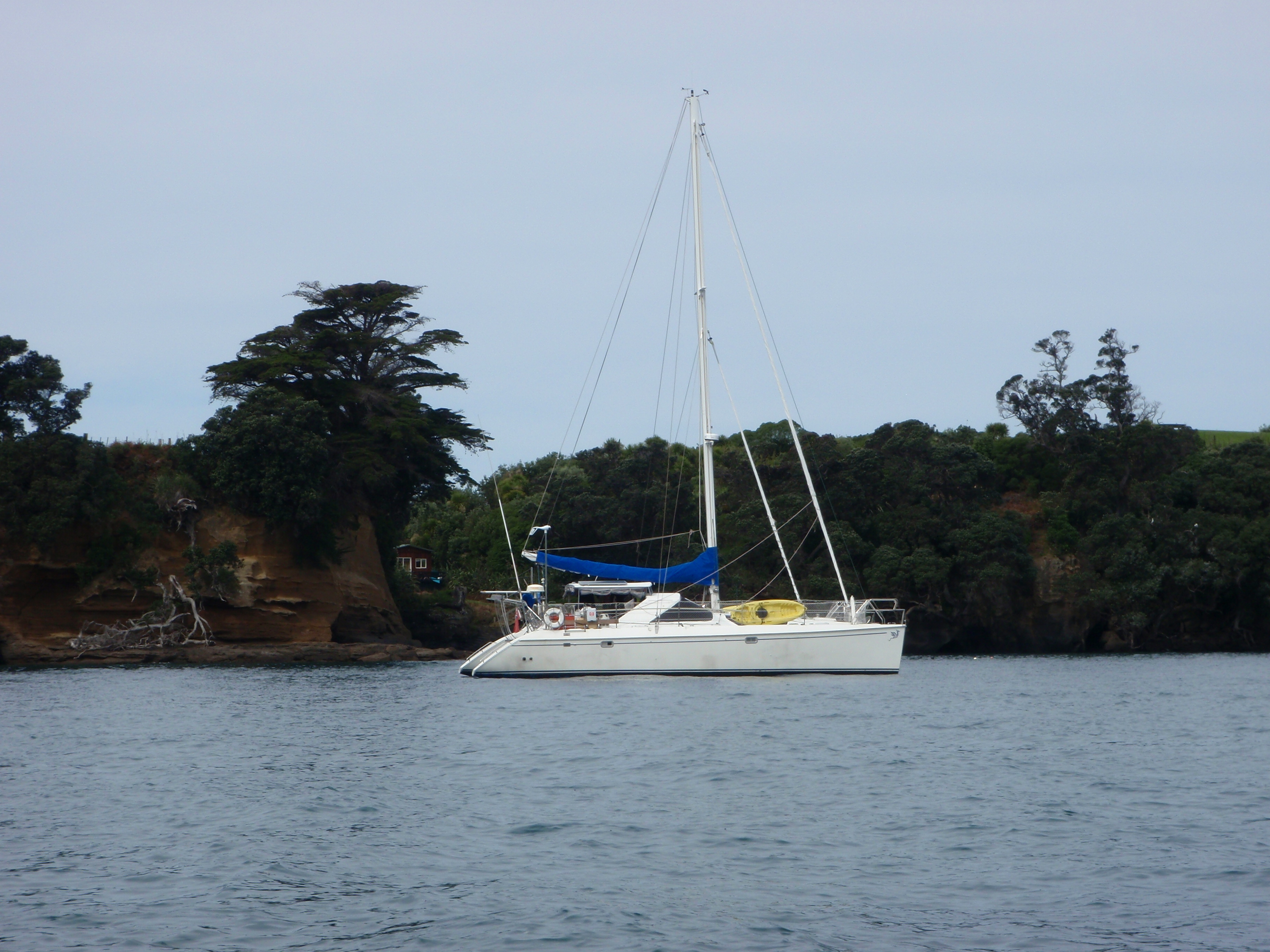
Reef Dragon moored at Leigh between survey trips. New Zealand, November 2012

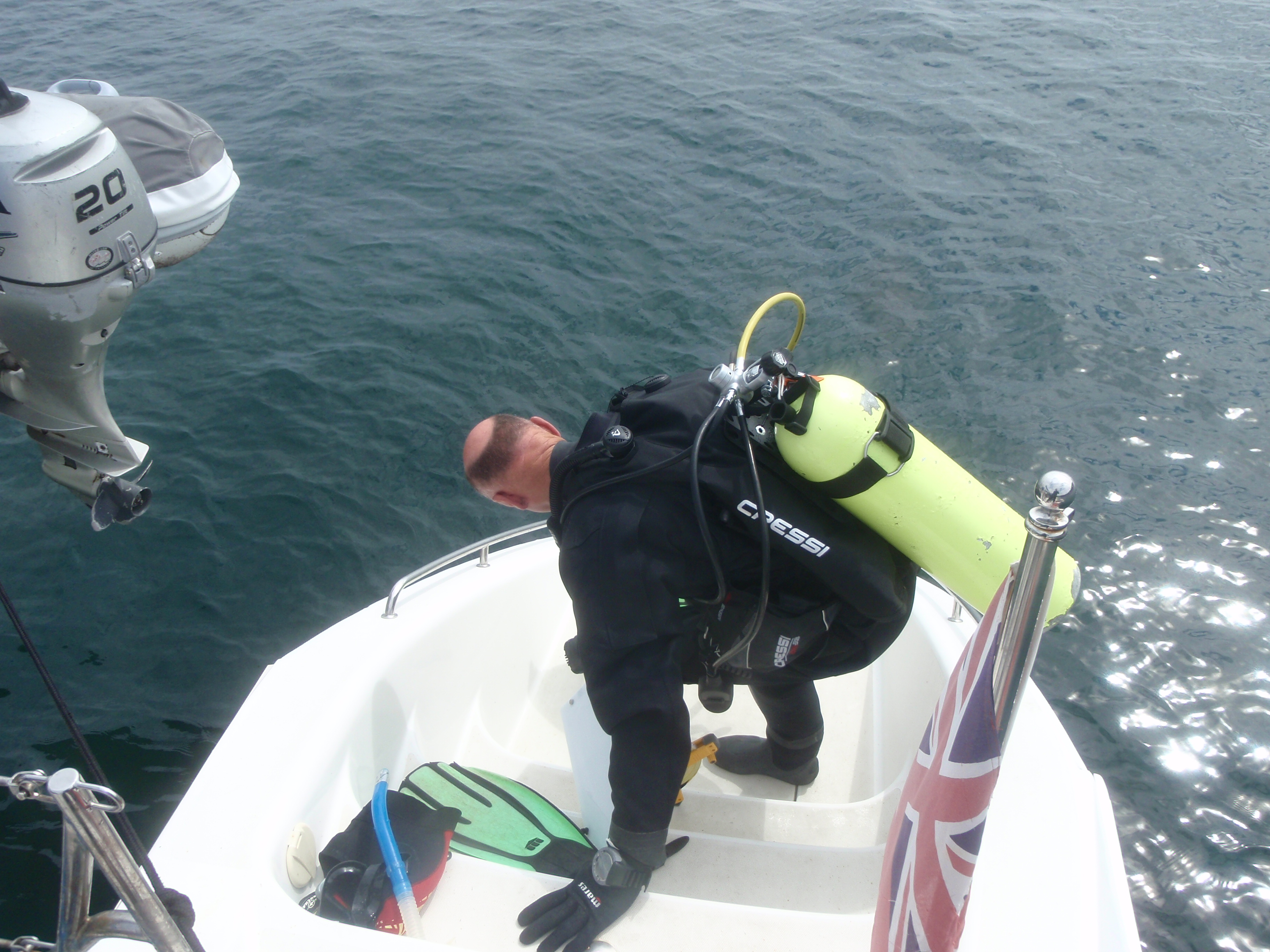
Volunteer diver preparing for a survey dive from the Reef Dragon

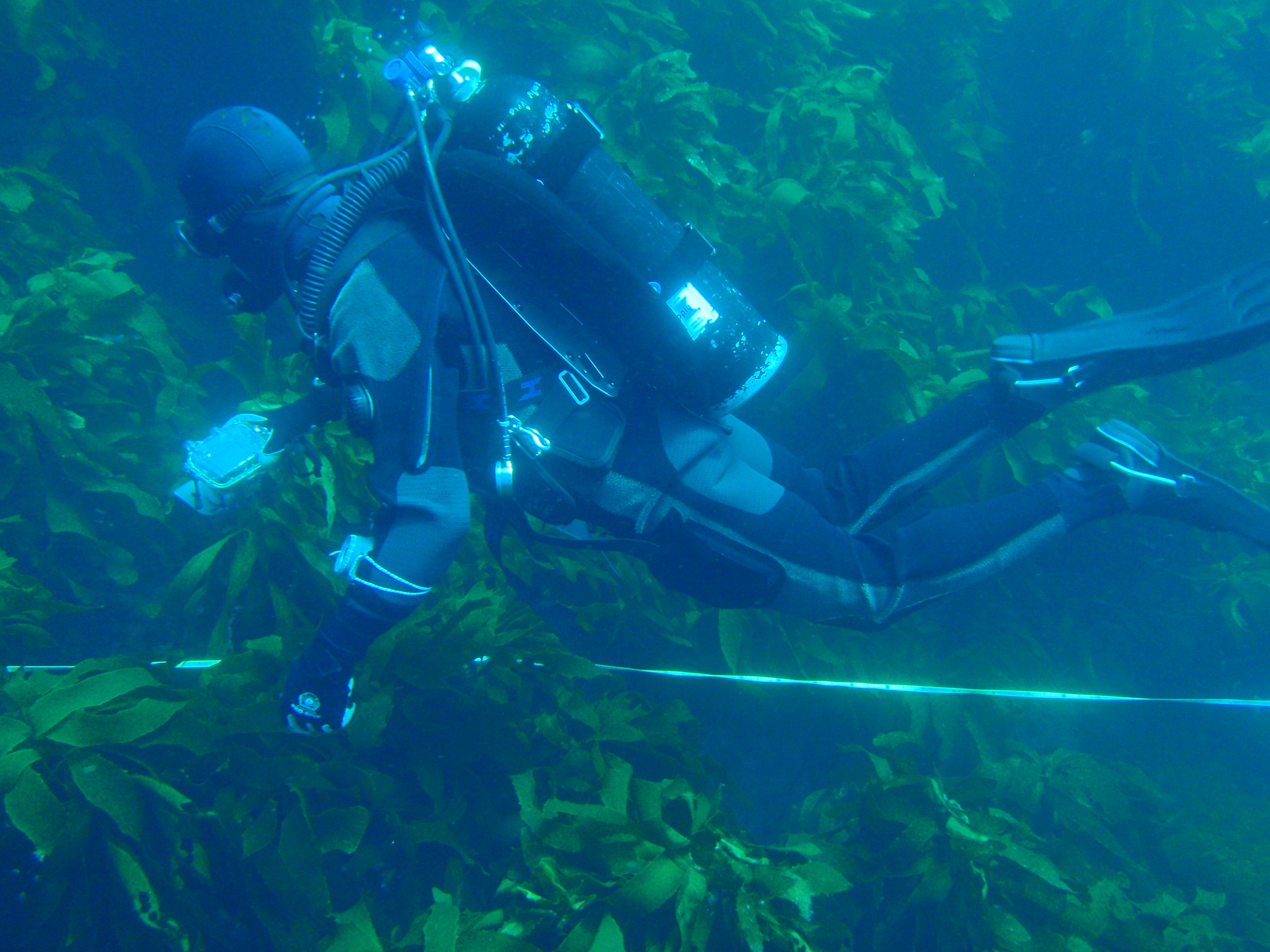
Swimming a transect for Reef Life Survey, Mayor Island, New Zealand, 2012

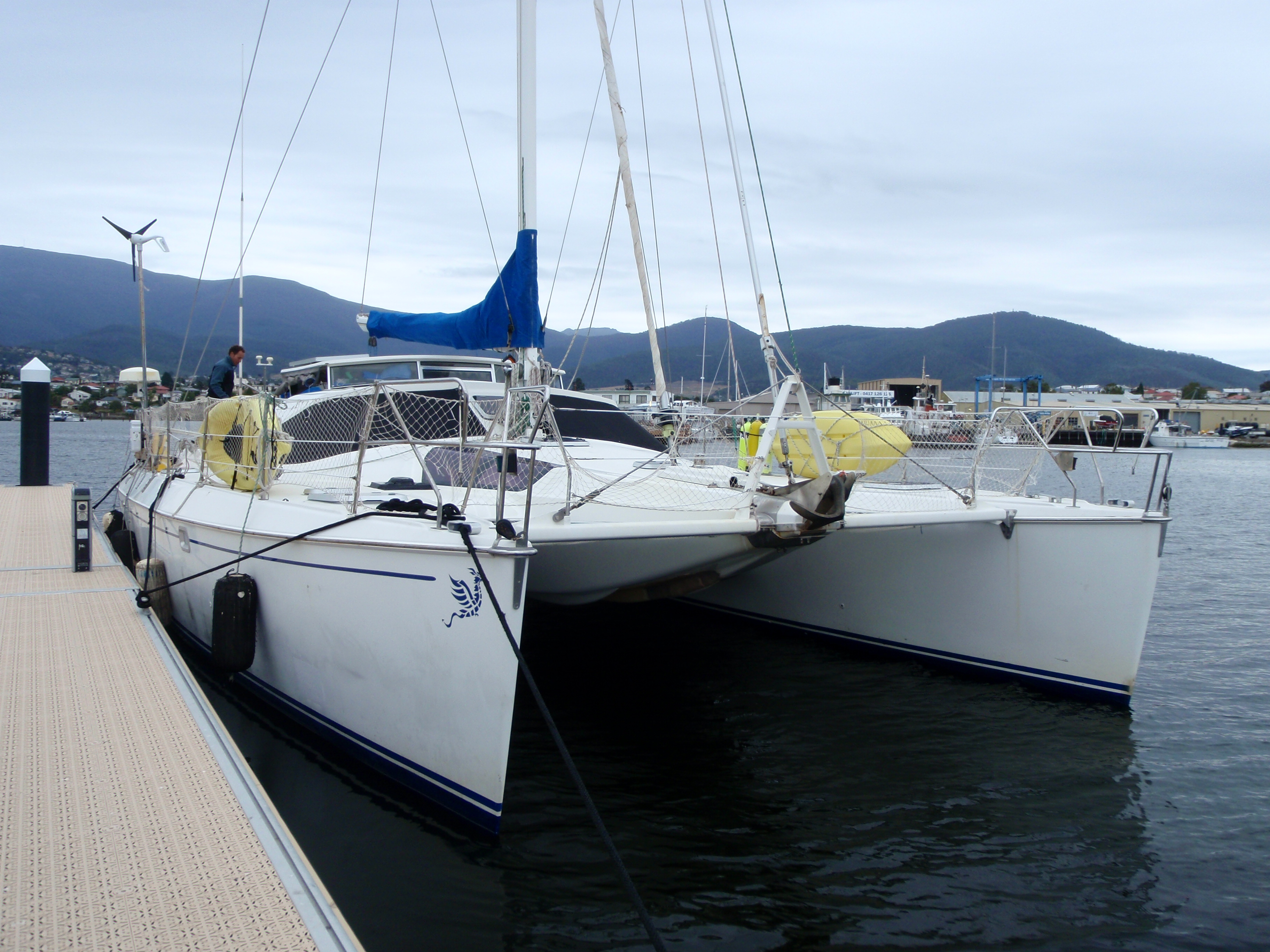
Reef Dragon in Hobart at the end of the circumnavigation of Australia

== Publications ==
- Global conservation outcomes depend on marine protected areas with five key features.
- Systematic global assessment of reef fish communities by the Reef Life Survey program.
- Exploited reefs protected from fishing transform over decades into conservation features not otherwise present in the seascape.
- Ecological effects of marine protected areas on rocky reef communities: a continental-scale analysis.
- Integrating abundance and functional traits reveals new global hotspots of fish diversity.

== See also ==
- Census of Coral Reefs – Field project of the Census of Marine Life
