= Depressor weight =

Shock reduction system in nautical tow line

Depressor weight implementation. The blue line indicates the unmodified tow line, while the red line indicates the shape created by the depressor weight.

A depressor weight is a device used on tow lines in nautical applications. A depressor weight can be attached to a floating or otherwise stiff line to effectively produce a catenary geometry better able to mitigate shocks associated with towing and wave impacts.

== See also ==
- Catenary – Curve formed by a hanging chain
