= Ultra-short baseline acoustic positioning system =

Method of underwater acoustic positioning

USBL (ultra-short baseline, also known as SSBL for "super-short base line") is a method of underwater acoustic positioning. A USBL system consists of a transceiver, which is mounted on a pole under a ship, and a transponder or responder on the seafloor, on a towfish, or on an ROV. A computer, or "topside unit", is used to calculate a position from the ranges and bearings measured by the transceiver.

== Mechanism ==
An acoustic pulse is transmitted by the transceiver and detected by the subsea transponder, which replies with its own acoustic pulse. This return pulse is detected by the shipboard transceiver. The time from the transmission of the initial acoustic pulse until the reply is detected is measured by the USBL system and is converted into a range.

To calculate a subsea position, the USBL calculates both a range and an angle from the transceiver to the subsea beacon. Angles are measured by the transceiver, which contains an array of transducers. The transceiver head normally contains three or more transducers separated by a baseline of 10 cm or less, hence the "short baseline" name. A method called “phase-differencing” within this transducer array is used to calculate the direction to the subsea transponder.

The presence of environmental noise reduces USBL positioning accuracy. Combining Kalman filtering with an element array has been used to filter the signals and improve accuracy, using the minimum mean-square error rule.

== Applications ==
USBLs are used in "inverted" (iUSBL) configurations, with the transceiver mounted on an autonomous underwater vehicle, and the transponder on the ship/shore that launches it. In this case, the "topside" processing happens inside the vehicle to allow it to locate the transponder for applications such as automatic docking, target tracking, and exchanging text messages.
