= Large unmanned undersea vehicle =

Large or extra-large unmanned undersea vehicles (LUUV or XLUUV) are a class of autonomous underwater vehicles (AUVs) that are significantly larger than traditional AUVs, which are typically used for tasks like surveying or mine countermeasures. Unlike smaller AUVs, XLUUVs are designed to operate for extended periods and carry larger payloads over vast distances without direct human control.

== Design and characteristics ==
XLUUVs are characterized by their size and endurance. While there's no international standard for what constitutes "extra-large," the Naval Sea Systems Command of the United States Navy considers an extra-large unmanned undersea vehicle to have a diameter of at least 54 inches (140 cm) and be capable of extended range and endurance.

== Primary roles and applications ==
The primary purpose of XLUUVs is to operate in environments that are too dangerous or difficult for manned submarines. Their key applications include:

- Intelligence, surveillance, and reconnaissance (ISR): They can covertly patrol large areas of the ocean, collecting data on a persistent basis.
- Mine countermeasures: XLUUVs can be used to locate and neutralize underwater mines, keeping manned vessels out of harm's way.
- Anti-submarine warfare (ASW): They can act as a persistent listening post or a launch platform for anti-submarine weapons.
- Seabed warfare: With their long endurance and superior stealth compared to manned systems, they are a cost-effective expandable tool.
- Payload delivery: Their large size allows them to deploy smaller AUVs, sensors, or other equipment to remote locations.

The development of XLUUVs is a key area of research for navies around the world, particularly as they seek to expand their undersea capabilities with autonomous and cost-effective platforms.

== (X)LUUV projects ==
| Project | Origin | Designer and/or Builder | Planned operators | Status | Source |
|---|---|---|---|---|---|
| Ghost Shark | Australia | Anduril Industries | Royal Australian Navy; United States Navy | In production | |
| SeaWolf | Australia | Cellula Robotics; Royal Australian Navy | Royal Australian Navy | In development | |
| Speartooth | Australia | C2 Robotics | Royal Australian Navy | In development | |
| Solus-XR | Canada | Cellula Robotics | Royal Canadian Navy | In development | |
| AJX-002 | China | | People's Liberation Army Navy | | |
| HSU-001 | China | | People's Liberation Army Navy | | |
| HSU-100 | China | | People's Liberation Army Navy | | |
| UUV-300 | China | | People's Liberation Army Navy | | |
| UCUV | France | Naval Group | French Navy | In development | |
| MUM | Germany | TKMS | n/a | Study | |
| Jalkapi XLUUV | India | Krishna Defence and Allied Industries Ltd | Indian Navy | In production | |
| Kapal Selam Otonom | Indonesia | PT PAL | Indonesian Navy | In development | |
| BlueWhale | Israel | ELTA Systems | Israeli Navy | In development | |
| LUUV | Japan | Mitsubishi Heavy Industries | Japan Maritime Self-Defense Force | In development | |
| Cephalopod | Russia | Rubin design bureau | Russian Navy | In development | |
| Harpsichord-2P-PM | Russia | Rosoboronexport | Russian Navy | In development | |
| Sarma-D | Russia | Lazurit Central Design Bureau | Russian Navy | In development | |
| Combat XLUUV | South Korea | Hanwha Ocean | Republic of Korea Navy | In development | |
| LUUV | Sweden | Saab Kockums | Swedish Navy | In development | |
| Hui Long | Taiwan | National Chung-Shan Institute of Science and Technology; Lungteh Shipbuilding | Republic of China Navy | In operation | |
| Black Whale | Taiwan | Longteh Shipbuilding | Republic of China Navy | In development | |
| XLUUV | Turkey | Dearsan | Turkish Naval Forces | In development | |
| STM Tengiz | Turkey | STM | Turkish Naval Forces | In development | |
| DATUM Sinarit | Turkey | Datum | Turkish Naval Forces | In development | |
| Cetus | United Kingdom | MSubs | Royal Navy | In development | |
| Herne | United Kingdom | BAE Systems | Royal Navy | In development | |
| Manta | United Kingdom | MSubs | n/a | Experimental | |
| Echo Voyager | United States | Boeing Phantom Works | n/a | Experimental | |
| Orca | United States | Boeing; Huntington Ingalls Industries | United States Navy | In development | |

== See also ==
- Unmanned underwater vehicle
- Autonomous underwater vehicle
- Unmanned surface vehicle
- Large Unmanned Surface Vehicle
