= Hammerhead (mine) =

American naval mine

- Type: Anti-submarine naval mine
- Place of origin: United States

Service history
- Used by: United States Navy (planned)

Production history
- Designed: 2018
- Manufacturer: General Dynamics
- Produced: 2026 or earlier

Specifications
- Filling: Mark 54 torpedo

The Hammerhead (also named Hammerhead Encapsulated Effector, or HHEE) is an anti-submarine naval mine currently being developed by the US Navy. Development began in 2018 to modernize the Navy's use of offensive mines, and orders were placed by 2026.

== Development and design ==
Development of the Hammerhead began in 2018 when the US Navy revised and modernized its offensive mining doctrine. The new plan called for new types of mines that could be deployed in a greater number of ways, such as submarines. The Hammerhead is similar to the Cold War-era Mark 60 CAPTOR; once deployed from the unmanned Orca submarine, it would sit upright on the seabed and autonomously detect enemy submarines before launching a modified Mark 54 torpedo which has a range of 6 miles (9.7 km). Aside from the torpedo, the Hammerhead comprises modules with unique roles, such as mooring the mine to the seafloor, providing electrical power, sensing a target, processing information, and providing communication.

In theory, the mass deployment of the mine in chokepoints could contain Russian or Chinese submarines while preventing them from approaching American vessels. If used with other types of mines that are also deployed using autonomous drones, the resulting minefields could be used to impede a theoretical invasion of Taiwan or prevent enemy submarines from crossing the first island chain. The weapon could also be used in a defensive role to intercept underwater weapons around coastal installations, such as Russia's Poseidon torpedo.

== Production ==
Despite the COVID-19 pandemic preventing in-person meetings, the Navy continued to develop the mine in the early 2020s. In 2020, it planned to order 30 prototypes in the 2021 fiscal year and operate further prototypes by the 2023 fiscal year. Work on prototypes began in September 2021, and 188 production models were ordered from General Dynamics in 2026 in addition to an unspecified amount already on order. The weapon would primarily be built at the company's factory in Taunton, Massachusetts.

== See also ==
- Seabed warfare
- Liberator (mine), a similar weapon also being developed by the US Navy
