= XV Patrick Blackett =

Experimental ship of the Royal Navy

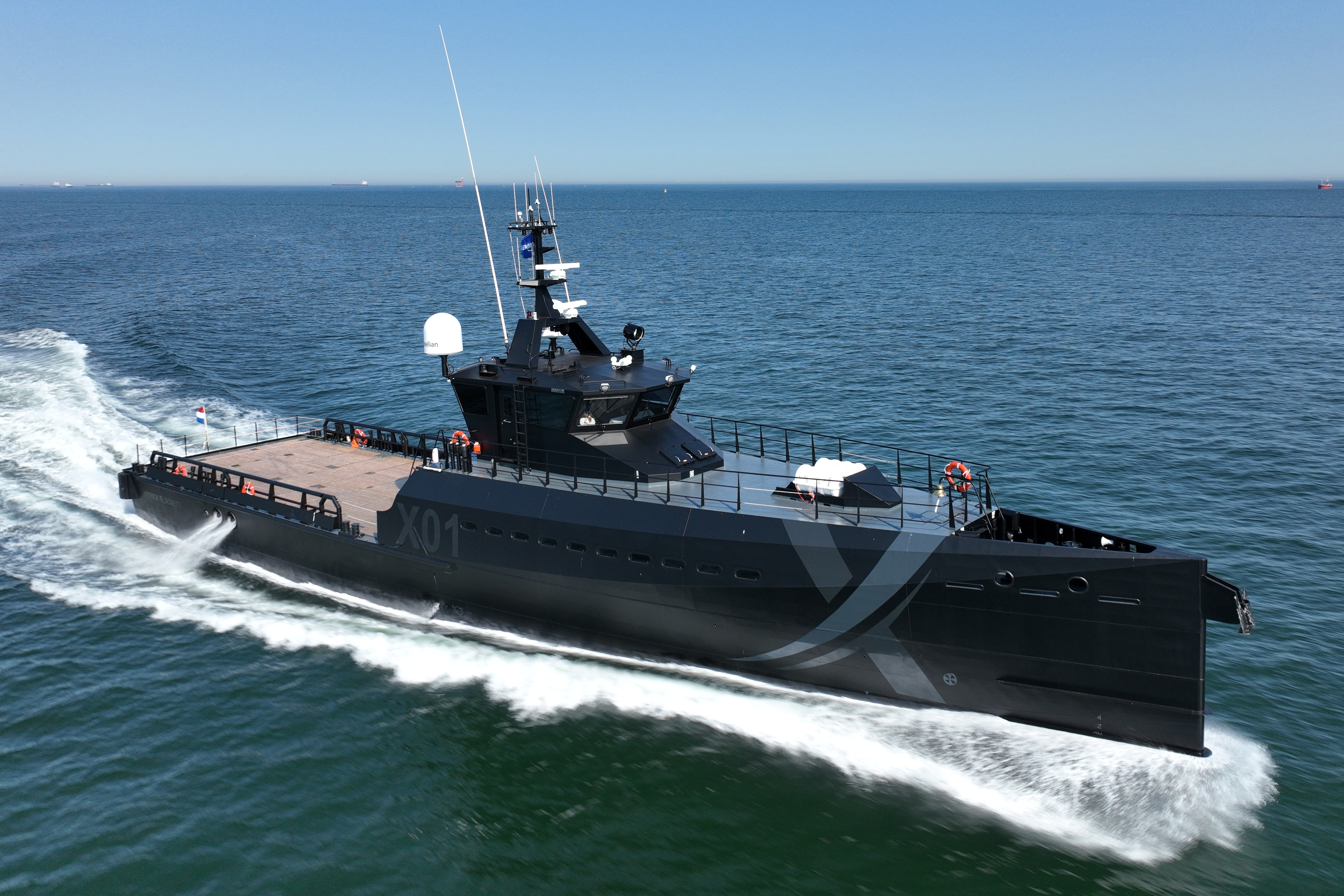

History

United Kingdom
- Name: Patrick Blackett
- Namesake: Patrick Blackett
- Builder: Damen Shipyards Gorinchem
- Home port: HMNB Portsmouth
- Identification: Pennant number: X01
- Status: Active

General characteristics
- Displacement: 270 t (270 long tons; 300 short tons)
- Length: 42 m (137 ft 10 in)
- Propulsion: 4 × Caterpillar C32 ACERT diesel engines
- Speed: In excess of 20 kn (37 km/h; 23 mph)
- Range: In excess of 3,000 nautical miles (6,000 km) at 20 kn (37 km/h)
- Complement: 5 (accommodation for up to 12)

XV Patrick Blackett (X01) is an experimental ship used by the Royal Navy as a testbed for new technologies, including unmanned underwater vehicles, unmanned surface vehicles and quantum navigation. Her namesake is Patrick Blackett the Nobel Prize-winning British physicist who was the director of Operational Research at the Royal Navy during the Second World War.

== Construction ==
On 3 December 2021, the Ministry of Defence published a tender seeking a ship that could be used by the Royal Navy's NavyX division for the testing and development of autonomous systems. The tender outlined a requirement for a ship that had already been built, with no previous owner, a displacement of no more than 500 tonnes, a length of at least 48 m (157 ft 6 in), a capability to reach 20 knots and deck space for at least two TEU containers. In January 2022, the MOD downselected a Damen-built FCS 4008 and a contract for it was signed in the following month. In March, ownership of the vessel was transferred to the Royal Navy, and in April, work began to adapt the vessel at Damen's shipyard facility in the Netherlands. Much of the work involved the conversion of passenger and cargo space into a briefing room, office and workshop. Upon completion, the ship's procurement amounted to less than £7 million.

== Characteristics ==
Patrick Blackett is an adapted Fast Crew Supplier 4008 (FCS 4008), designed and built by Damen Group. She is painted matte black, rather than the Royal Navy's standard Light Weatherwork Grey, complete with NavyX insignia on both sides of the hull. Her pennant, X01, is also uniquely highlighted in gloss paint and large QR codes are painted to either side of her superstructure, allowing smartphone users to scan them and view NavyX content. Patrick Blackett is crewed by five Royal Navy personnel but there is accommodation for up to 12. Her hull form is designed to cut through waves and remain stable and, as such, she has an axe bow, less forward buoyancy and a long, tapered hull. Her aft wooden working deck has a capacity of up to 100 tonnes, securing points for two TEU containers, along with electrical power and cooling water supplies. A knuckle-boom crane also allows for the embarkation of stores up to around 4 tonnes or a small craft over the side. She is capable of speeds in excess of 20 kn (37 km/h; 23 mph), with a range in excess of 3,000 nautical miles (6,000 km) at 20 kn (37 km/h). She is driven by four Caterpillar C32 Acert diesel engines and electrical power is provided by two 99 kW generators. She is also equipped with a 120 kW hydraulically-driven bow thruster, which allows her to berth and unberth unaided.

Patrick Blackett will be used as a testbed by NavyX, a division of the Royal Navy tasked with fielding new and innovative technologies, particularly autonomous systems and artificial intelligence.

== Operational history ==
Patrick Blackett entered HMNB Portsmouth for the first time on 27 July 2022, ahead of her christening ceremony which took place on 29 July 2022 with Commander Samuel Nightingale assigned as her First Commanding Officer. During her christening ceremony, a glass bottle of champagne was smashed against her hull by a robotic dog, but the bottle did not break. Unlike other ships of the Royal Navy, Patrick Blackett is not a commissioned ship and would instead fly the Blue Ensign, denoting government ownership. Once in active service, the ship would have a routine crew of five Royal Navy personnel, and participate in Royal Navy and NATO exercises.

The ship went to sea under the Blue Ensign for the first time on 21 February 2023 to undergo sea acceptance trials.

She participated in Exercise Neptune Reach off the south coast of England, in which the Royal Navy, British Army and Royal Air Force worked together under Project Vantage - a test and evaluation programme for maritime uncrewed systems. During the exercise, Patrick Blackett launched a Nyan one-way attack drone via catapult off her aft deck.

== See also ==
Project Cetus
