= Orca (AUV) =

Autonomous underwater vehicle

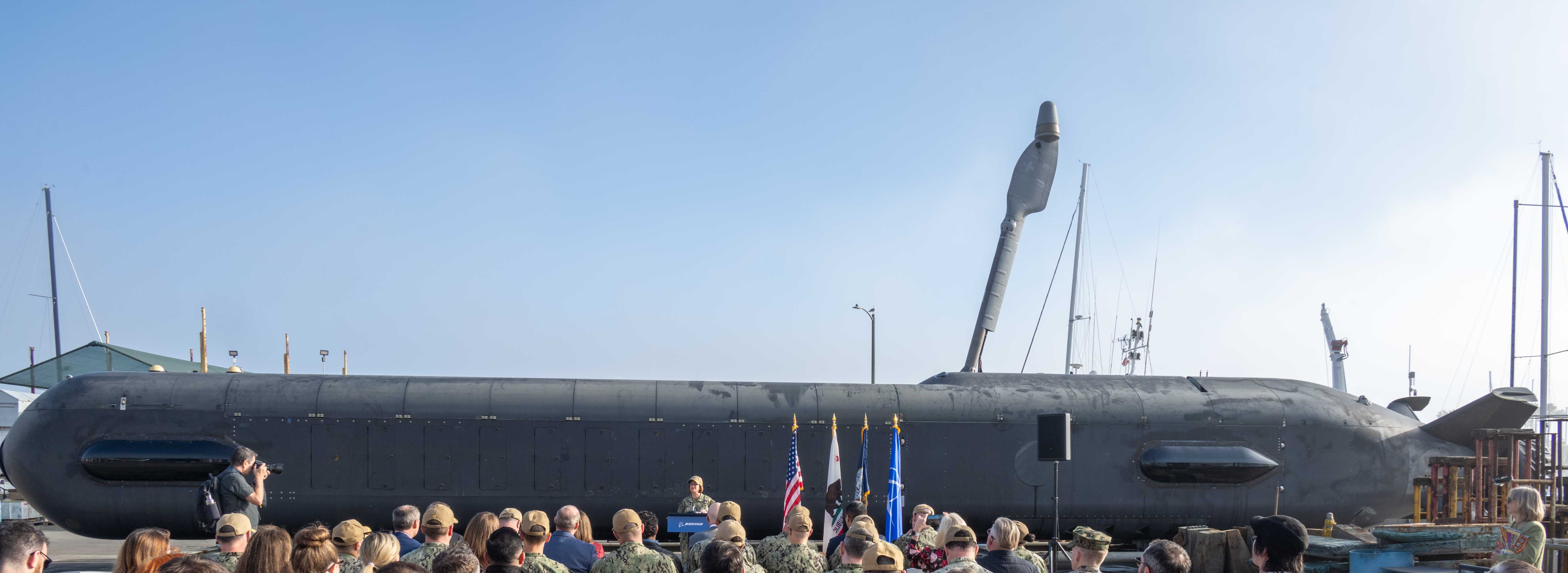
CNO Adm. Lisa Franchetti speaks in front of Boeing’s Orca Extra Large Unmanned Undersea Vehicle

The Orca is an autonomous underwater vehicle (AUV) that is under development by Boeing and Huntington Ingalls Industries (HII) for the United States Navy.

== Development ==
The Orca dates back to September 2017, when the Navy issued contracts worth about US$40 million each to Boeing, which had partnered earlier in the year with HII to build uncrewed submarines, and Lockheed Martin to develop competing designs for an extra-large unmanned undersea vehicle (XLUUV) capable of autonomous operation on missions up to several months in duration. In February 2019, the Navy awarded the Boeing/HII consortium a $43 million contract to begin work on building four of their XLUUVs, the design of which would be based on Boeing's earlier AUV Echo Voyager. The following month, the Navy added a fifth vehicle to the order, with the total value of the contract reaching $274.4 million. Orca deliveries were planned to be completed by the end of 2022. The Navy took delivery of the first Orca in December, 2023.

== Design ==
The basic Orca design shares a 51 feet (16 m) length with Echo Voyager, but the Orca will incorporate a more modular construction, primarily for the capability to be built with an additional payload module of up to 34 feet (10 m) long and a capacity of 8 tonnes (8,000 kg) for a total length of 85 feet (26 m). The Navy specified the ability to adapt the Orca platform according to mission, with the ability for surveillance, submerged, surface, and electronic combat, and minesweeping. The vessel will be powered by a hybrid diesel/lithium-ion battery system, which powers the Orca by battery while submerged and recharges the batteries with diesel generators while surfaced. Maximum speed is 8 knots (15 km/h), though the typical service speed is about 3 knots (5.6 km/h), which gives the Orca a range of up to 6,500 miles (10,500 km) with an endurance of several months.

One of the weapons intended for use on the Orca is the Liberator, a naval mine under development. In operation, the Orca could be loaded with dozens of Liberators to deposit on the seabed in enemy controlled regions, which could later launch a Mark 48 torpedo when an enemy vessel passes. A similar mine, the Hammerhead, would be deployed by the Orca in the same way to target enemy submarines and underwater vehicles.

== See also ==
- Ghost Shark
- Cetus
- HSU-001
- Hui Long
- BlueWhale
