= PWT unmanned vehicles =

Unmanned underwater vehicles

PWT unmanned underwater vehicles (UUV)s are uncrewed vehicles developed in the People's Republic of China (PRC) by PWT (short for Planet Wheel Technology Co. Ltd, 行星轮科技有限公司) in Wuhan, most of which are in service with various Chinese governmental agencies/departments, and government-owned enterprises.

== PWT USV ==
PWT unmanned surface vehicle (USV) is a micro USV specially designed to perform environmental surveillance missions, namely, the water quality of rivers, lakes, and reservoirs. The USV is a compact design intended to be easily transportable, and can be carried in a SUV. The modular design enables it to carry various scientific equipments, with data collected transmitted back to control station/control center in real time. In addition to water quality monitoring, the USV has also been used in hydrographic surveying and as target drones.

== PWT ROUV ==
PWT remotely operated underwater vehicle (ROUV) is an unmanned underwater vehicle (UUV) designed for underwater archaeology, inspection and observation mission to a depth of 500 meter. Equipped with eight thrusters, the modular design enables the ROUV to be fitted with different cameras, lights, and other equipment based on the mission and customer need. Specification:

- Length: 0.5 meter
- Width: 0.5 meter
- Height: 0.35 meter
- Weight: 13 kg
- Payload: 10 kg
- Speed: 2 meter / second
- Maximum operating depth: 500 meter
