= Liberator (mine) =

American naval mine

- Type: Naval mine
- Place of origin: United States

Service history
- Used by: United States Navy (planned)

Specifications
- Filling: Mark 46 torpedo

Liberator is a naval mine currently being developed by the US Navy. The weapon is intended to be deployed by the autonomous Orca submarine and launch a torpedo, or some other payload, at enemy vessels from the seabed.

== Development ==
Liberator is a seabed-mounted container intended to launch the Mark 48 torpedo or other payloads. First disclosed by the US Navy in a June 2025 budget report, the system was described as, "an alternative delivery system for torpedoes or similar devices". The project had been in development for several years at Naval Undersea Warfare Center Newport prior to the disclosure, and received funds during the 2026 fiscal year to build a prototype. The system is intended to be deployed from the Orca, an autonomous submarine also under development. Naval News speculated that, during a war, an Orca can deploy dozens of Liberators in enemy-controlled water, with the weapon waiting to deploy a torpedo until an enemy vessel is in range. In a conflict, the mass deployment of the mine would limit the maneuverability of enemy fleets or cut off key waterways while being difficult to destroy on the seabed. The 650 lb (290 kg) warhead of the Mark 48 torpedo would pose a significant threat to both ships and submarines. Other payloads were theorized to include autonomous drones or multiple Mark 54 torpedoes.

== See also ==
- Seabed warfare
- Mark 60 CAPTOR, a similar weapon used by the US during the Cold War
