= Hui Long-class UUV =

Class of unmanned underwater vehicle

The Hui Long-class UUV (慧龍號無人潛艦) is a Taiwanese class of unmanned underwater vehicle. It is a joint project of the National Chung-Shan Institute of Science and Technology (NCSIST) and Lungteh Shipbuilding.

The Hui Long is believed to be approximately 30 meters long, 6 meters high, 3.6 meters wide, and to displace around 100 tons. The vehicle has a pair of torpedo tubes. It was not initially tested with an active propulsion system. Furthermore, the unmanned submarine is equipped with two cameras; one is placed at the front and one at the rear of its sail.

== History ==
The Hui Long Project was initiated in 2019 with a budget of NT$3.6 billion (US$128.2 million).

The Hui Long is initially intended to be used as a test platform to validate equipment related to the Hai Kun-class submarine program.

== See also ==
- Orca (AUV)
- HSU-001
- SX-404-class submarine
- CSBC Endeavor Manta
- NCSIST Kuai Chi
