= BAE Systems Nyan =

British one-way attack drone

The BAE Systems Nyan is a British-built, jet-powered, uncrewed one-way attack drone developed by Callen-Lenz, a subsidiary of BAE Systems. It is designed to carry out deep strikes in GNSS-denied and highly-contested environments. It is launched by pneumatic catapults from ground or naval platforms. It has a single gas-turbine engine, a 2.9 metres (9 ft 6 in) wingspan, a 20 kilograms (44 lb) payload, a cruise speed of 120 knots (140 mph), and a range exceeding 150 miles (240 km). The Nyan is a less costly alternative to long-range cruise missiles such as Storm Shadow. It is built from carbon fibre and has seen more than 1,000 units produced.

It has also been widely used by the Armed Forces of Ukraine in their deep strike campaign during the Russo-Ukrainian war (2022–present). Russia responded to reports that Ukraine was using British drones including Nyan by threatening a "higher price" for the UK deepening its support for Ukraine in the conflict.

Throughout 2026, the Royal Navy conducted trials of Nyan, initially from experimentation ship XV Patrick Blackett in July, and from the carrier HMS Queen Elizabeth in early November, both utilising a rail-launch system. The British Army has also conducted tests of Nyan while deployed as part of NATO forces in Estonia.
