= Seabed Arms Control Treaty =

1971 international agreement limiting nuclear weapons on the sea floor

Treaty on the Prohibition of the Emplacement of Nuclear Weapons and Other Weapons of Mass Destruction on the Sea-Bed and the Ocean Floor and in the Subsoil Thereof
Ratifications and signatories of the treaty
Parties
Signatories
Non-parties
- Signed: 11 February 1971
- Effective: 18 May 1972
- Condition: 22 ratifications (including depositary states)
- Signatories: 84
- Parties: 94 (as of May 2014)
- Depositary: Governments of the United States of America, the United Kingdom of Great Britain and Northern Ireland, and the Union of Soviet Socialist Republics
- Languages: English, French, Russian, Spanish and Chinese

Full text
- Seabed Arms Control Treaty at Wikisource

The Seabed Arms Control Treaty (or Seabed Treaty, formally the Treaty on the Prohibition of the Emplacement of Nuclear Weapons and Other Weapons of Mass Destruction on the Sea-Bed and the Ocean Floor and in the Subsoil thereof) is a multilateral agreement between the United States, Soviet Union (now Russia), United Kingdom, and 91 other countries banning the emplacement of nuclear weapons or "weapons of mass destruction" on the seabed and the ocean floor beyond a 12 nautical miles (22.2 km; 13.8 mi) coastal zone. It allows signatories to observe all seabed "activities" of any other signatory beyond the 12-mile zone to ensure compliance.

Like the Antarctic Treaty, the Outer Space Treaty, and the Nuclear-Weapon-Free Zone treaties, the Seabed Arms Control Treaty sought to prevent the introduction of international conflict and nuclear weapons into an area hitherto free of them. Reaching agreement on the seabed, however, involved problems that were not met in framing the other two agreements, for example while the Soviet Union initially desired the banning of all military activity including sensors detecting submarine movements, the United States desired the more limited "workable, verifiable and effective agreement to bar the use of the seabed for the emplacement of weapons of mass destruction."

== History ==
In the 1960s, advances in the technology of oceanography and greatly increased interest in the vast and virtually untapped resources of the ocean floor led to concern that the absence of clearly established rules of law might lead to strife. There were concurrent fears that nations might use the seabed as a new environment for military installations, including those capable of launching nuclear weapons. For example the U.S. Defense Science Board had considered placing on the ocean floor large missiles in silos or on self-propelled crawling vehicles controlled using umbilical cords.

In keeping with a proposal submitted to the U.N. Secretary General by Ambassador Pardo of Malta in August 1967, the U.N. General Assembly, on 18 December 1967, established an ad hoc committee to study ways of reserving the seabed for peaceful purposes, with the objective of ensuring "that the exploration and use of the seabed and the ocean floor should be conducted in accordance with the principles and purposes of the Charter of the United Nations, in the interests of maintaining international peace and security and for the benefit of all mankind." The committee was given permanent status the following year. At the same time, seabed-related military and arms control issues were referred to the Eighteen Nation Committee on Disarmament (ENDC) and its successor, the Conference of the Committee on Disarmament (CCD). In a message of 18 March 1969, President Nixon said the American delegation to the ENDC should seek discussion of the factors necessary for an international agreement prohibiting the emplacement of weapons of mass destruction on the seabed and ocean floor and pointed out that an agreement of this kind would, like the Antarctic and Outer Space treaties, "prevent an arms race before it has a chance to start."

== Status ==
=== List of parties ===
The Seabed Arms Control Treaty was opened for signature in Washington, London, and Moscow on 11 February 1971. It entered into force 18 May 1972, when the United States, the United Kingdom, the Soviet Union, and more than 22 nations had deposited instruments of ratification. As of October 2018, 94 current states are parties to the treaty, while another 21 have signed the treaty but have not completed ratification.

Multiple dates indicate the different days in which states submitted their signature or deposition, which varied by location. This location is noted by: (L) for London, (M) for Moscow, and (W) for Washington.

State	Signed	Deposited	Method
Afghanistan	Feb 11, 1971 (L, M, W)	Apr 22, 1971 (M); Apr 23, 1971 (L); May 21, 1971 (W)	Ratification
Algeria		Jan 27, 1992 (W)	Accession
Antigua and Barbuda		Nov 16, 1988 (W); Dec 26, 1988 (M); Jan 26, 1989 (L)	Succession from United Kingdom
Argentina	Sep 3, 1971 (L, M, W)	Mar 21, 1983 (L, M, W)	Ratification
Australia	Feb 11, 1971 (L, M, W)	Jan 23, 1973 (L, M, W)	Ratification
Austria	Feb 11, 1971 (L, M, W)	Aug 10, 1972 (L, M, W)	Ratification
Bahamas		Jun 7, 1989 (W)	Accession
Belarus	Mar 3, 1971 (M)	Sep 14, 1971 (M)	Ratified as the Byelorussian SSR
Belgium	Feb 11, 1971 (L, M, W)	Nov 20, 1972 (L, M, W)	Ratification
Benin	Mar 18, 1971 (W)	Jun 19, 1986 (M); Jul 2, 1986 (L); Jul 7, 1986 (W)	Ratification
Bosnia and Herzegovina		Aug 15, 1994 (W)	Succession from SFR Yugoslavia
Botswana	Feb 11, 1971 (W)	Nov 10, 1972 (W)	Ratification
Brazil	Sep 3, 1971 (L, M, W)	May 10, 1988 (L, W); Aug 4, 1988 (M)	Ratification
Bulgaria	Feb 11, 1971 (L, M, W)	Apr 16, 1971 (M); May 7, 1971 (W); May 26, 1971 (L)	Ratification
Canada	Feb 11, 1971 (L, M, W)	May 17, 1972 (L, M, W)	Ratification
Cape Verde		Oct 24, 1979 (M)	Accession
Central African Republic	Feb 11, 1971 (W)	Jul 9, 1981 (W)	Ratification
China		Feb 28, 1991 (L, M, W)	Accession
Congo		Oct 23, 1978 (W)	Accession
Cuba		Jun 3, 1977 (M)	Accession
Cyprus	Feb 11, 1971 (L, M, W)	Nov 17, 1971 (L, M); Dec 30, 1971 (W)	Ratification
Czech Republic		Jan 1, 1993 (W); Apr 5, 1993 (L); Apr 9, 1993 (M)	Succession from Czechoslovakia
Denmark	Feb 11, 1971 (L, M, W)	Jun 15, 1971 (L, M, W)	Ratification
Dominican Republic	Feb 11, 1971 (W)	Feb 11, 1972 (W)	Ratification
Eswatini	Feb 11, 1971 (W)	Aug 9, 1971 (W)	Ratification
Ethiopia	Feb 11, 1971 (L, M, W)	Jul 12, 1977 (L); Jul 14, 1977 (M, W)	Ratification
Finland	Feb 11, 1971 (L, M, W)	Jun 8, 1971 (L, M, W)	Ratification
Germany	Jun 8, 1971 (L, M, W)	Nov 18, 1975 (L, W)	Ratification
Ghana	Feb 11, 1971 (L, M, W)	Aug 9, 1972 (W)	Ratification
Greece	Feb 11, 1971 (M); Feb 12, 1971 (W)	May 28, 1985 (L, M, W)	Ratification
Guatemala	Feb 11, 1971 (W)	Apr 1, 1996 (W)	Ratification
Guinea-Bissau		Aug 20, 1976 (M)	Accession
Hungary	Feb 11, 1971 (L, M, W)	Aug 13, 1971 (L, M, W)	Ratification
Iceland	Feb 11, 1971 (L, M, W)	May 30, 1972 (L, M, W)	Ratification
India		Jul 20, 1973 (L, M, W)	Accession
Iran	Feb 11, 1971 (L, M, W)	Aug 26, 1971 (L, W); Sep 6, 1971 (M)	Ratification
Iraq	Feb 22, 1971 (M)	Sep 13, 1972 (M)	Ratification
Ireland	Feb 11, 1971 (L, W)	Aug 19, 1971 (L, W)	Ratification
Italy	Feb 11, 1971 (L, M, W)	Sep 3, 1974 (L, M, W)	Ratification
Ivory Coast		Jan 14, 1972 (M, W)	Accession
Jamaica	Oct 11, 1971 (L, W); Oct 14, 1971 (M)	Jul 30, 1986 (L, M, W)	Ratification
Japan	Feb 11, 1971 (L, M, W)	Jun 21, 1971 (L, M, W)	Ratification
Jordan	Feb 11, 1971 (L, M, W)	Aug 17, 1971 (W); Aug 30, 1971 (M); Nov 1, 1971 (L)	Ratification
Laos	Feb 11, 1971 (L, W); Feb 15, 1971 (M)	Oct 19, 1971 (L); Oct 22, 1971 (M); Nov 3, 1971 (W)	Ratification
Latvia		Jun 24, 1992 (L); Aug 3, 1992 (W); Aug 21, 1992 (M)	Accession
Lesotho	Sep 8, 1971 (W)	Apr 3, 1973 (W)	Ratification
Libya		Jul 6, 1990 (M)	Accession
Liechtenstein		May 30, 1991 (L, W); May 31, 1991 (M)	Accession
Luxembourg	Feb 11, 1971 (L, M, W)	Nov 11, 1982 (L, M, W)	Ratification
Malaysia	May 20, 1971 (L, M, W)	Jun 21, 1972 (L, M, W)	Ratification
Malta	Feb 11, 1971 (L, W)	May 4, 1971 (W)	Ratification
Mauritius	Feb 11, 1971 (W)	Apr 23, 1971 (W); May 3, 1971 (L); May 18, 1971 (M)	Ratification
Mexico		Mar 23, 1984 (L, M, W)	Accession
Mongolia	Feb 11, 1971 (L, M)	Oct 8, 1971 (M); Nov 15, 1981 (L)	Ratification
Montenegro		Jun 3, 2006 (M); Dec 12, 2006 (L)	Succession from FR Yugoslavia (Note: Montenegro's effective date of succession was 3 June 2006.)
Morocco	Feb 11, 1971 (M, W); Feb 18, 1971 (L)	Jul 26, 1971 (L); Aug 5, 1971 (W); Jan 18, 1972 (M)	Ratification
Nepal	Feb 11, 1971 (M, W); Feb 24, 1971 (L)	Jul 6, 1971 (L); Jul 29, 1971 (M); Aug 9, 1971 (W)	Ratification
Netherlands	Feb 11, 1971 (L, M, W)	Jan 14, 1976 (L, M, W)	Ratification
New Zealand	Feb 11, 1971 (L, M, W)	Feb 24, 1972 (L, M, W)	Ratification
Nicaragua	Feb 11, 1971 (W)	Feb 7, 1973 (W)	Ratification
Niger	Feb 11, 1971 (W)	Aug 9, 1971 (W)	Ratification
Norway	Feb 11, 1971 (L, M, W)	Jun 28, 1971 (L, M); Jun 29, 1971 (W)	Ratification
Panama	Feb 11, 1971 (W)	Mar 20, 1974 (W)	Ratification
Philippines		Nov 5, 1993 (L)	Accession
Poland	Feb 11, 1971 (L, M, W)	Nov 15, 1971 (L, M, W)	Ratification
Portugal		Jun 24, 1975 (L, M, W)	Accession
Qatar		Nov 12, 1974 (L)	Accession
Romania	Feb 11, 1971 (L, M, W)	Jul 10, 1972 (L, M, W)	Ratification
Russia	Feb 11, 1971 (L, M, W)	May 18, 1972 (L, M, W)	Ratified as the Soviet Union
Rwanda	Feb 11, 1971 (W)	May 20, 1975 (L, M, W)	Ratification
Saint Kitts and Nevis		May 18, 1972 (W)	Accession
Saint Vincent and the Grenadines		May 13, 1999 (L)	Succession from United Kingdom
São Tomé and Príncipe		Aug 24, 1979 (M)	Accession
Saudi Arabia	Jan 7, 1972 (W)	Jun 23, 1972 (W)	Ratification
Serbia		Jun 3, 2006 (L, M)	Succession from FR Yugoslavia
Seychelles		Mar 12, 1985 (L); Mar 14, 1985 (M); Apr 8, 1985 (W)	Accession
Singapore	May 5, 1971 (L, M, W)	Sep 10, 1976 (L, M, W)	Ratification
Slovakia		Jan 1, 1993 (W); May 17, 1993 (L); Jun 25, 1993 (M)	Succession from Czechoslovakia
Slovenia		Apr 7, 1992 (L); Aug 20, 1992 (W)	Succession from SFR Yugoslavia
Solomon Islands		Jun 17, 1981 (L)	Succession from United Kingdom
South Africa	Feb 11, 1971 (W)	Nov 14, 1973 (W); Nov 26, 1973 (L); Nov 30, 1973 (M)	Ratification
South Korea	Feb 11, 1971 (L, W)	Jun 25, 1987 (L, W)	Ratification
Spain		Jul 15, 1987 (L, M, W)	Accession
Sweden	Feb 11, 1971 (L, M, W)	Apr 28, 1972 (L, M, W)	Ratification
Switzerland	Feb 11, 1971 (L, M, W)	May 4, 1976 (L, M, W)	Ratification
Togo	Apr 2, 1971 (W)	Jun 28, 1971 (W)	Ratification
Tunisia	Feb 11, 1971 (L, M, W)	Oct 22, 1971 (M); Oct 28, 1971 (L); Oct 29, 1971 (W)	Ratification
Turkey	Feb 25, 1971 (L, M, W)	Oct 19, 1972 (W); Oct 25, 1972 (L); Oct 30, 1972 (M)	Ratification
Ukraine	Mar 3, 1971 (M)	Sep 3, 1971 (M)	Ratified as the Ukrainian SSR
United Kingdom	Feb 11, 1971 (L, M, W)	May 18, 1972 (L, M, W)	Ratification
United States	Feb 11, 1971 (L, M, W)	May 18, 1972 (L, M, W)	Ratification
Vietnam		Jun 20, 1980 (M)	Accession as the Socialist Republic of Vietnam (Note: Signed by the Republic of Vietnam on 11 February 1971, but following the victory by the Democratic Republic of Vietnam in the Vietnam War, the reunified Socialist Republic of Vietnam renounced all treaty actions performed by the Republic of Vietnam.)
Yemen	Feb 23, 1971 (M)	Jun 1, 1979 (M)	Ratification
Zambia		Oct 9, 1972 (L); Nov 1, 1972 (W); Nov 2, 1972 (M)	Accession

=== State with limited recognition, abiding by treaty ===
The Republic of China (Taiwan), which is currently only recognized by 11 UN member states, deposited their instruments of ratification of the treaty prior to the United States' decision to switch their recognition of the sole legitimate government of China from the Republic of China (ROC) to the People's Republic of China (PRC) in 1971. When the PRC subsequently ratified the treaty, they described the ROC's ratification as "illegal". The ROC has committed itself to continue to adhere to the requirements of the treaty, and the United States has declared that they still consider them to be "bound by its obligations".

State	Signed	Deposited	Method
Republic of China	Feb 11, 1971	Feb 22, 1972	Ratification

=== States that have signed but not ratified ===
State	Signed
Bolivia	Feb 11, 1971 (L, M, W)
Burundi	Feb 11, 1971 (M, W)
Cambodia	Feb 11, 1971 (W)
Cameroon	Nov 11, 1971 (M)
Colombia	Feb 11, 1971 (W)
Costa Rica	Feb 11, 1971 (W)
Equatorial Guinea	Jun 4, 1971 (W)
Gambia	May 18, 1971 (L); May 21, 1971 (M); Oct 29, 1971 (W)
Guinea	Feb 11, 1971 (M, W)
Honduras	Feb 11, 1971 (W)
Lebanon	Feb 11, 1971 (L, M, W)
Liberia	Feb 11, 1971 (W)
Madagascar	Sep 14, 1971 (W)
Mali	Feb 11, 1971 (W); Feb 15, 1971 (M)
Myanmar	Feb 11, 1971 (L, M, W)
Paraguay	Feb 23, 1971 (W)
Senegal	Mar 17, 1971 (W)
Sierra Leone	Feb 11, 1971 (L); Feb 12, 1971 (M); Feb 24, 1971 (W)
Sudan	Feb 11, 1971 (L); Feb 12, 1971 (M)
Tanzania	Feb 11, 1971 (W)
Uruguay	Feb 11, 1971 (W)

=== Non-signatory states ===
The remaining UN member states and UN observer states, which have not signed the treaty, are:

- Albania
- Andorra
- Angola
- Armenia
- Azerbaijan
- Bahrain
- Bangladesh
- Barbados
- Belize
- Bhutan
- Brunei
- Burkina Faso
- Chad
- Chile
- Comoros
- Democratic Republic of the Congo
- Croatia
- Djibouti
- Dominica
- Ecuador
- Egypt
- El Salvador
- Eritrea
- Estonia
- Fiji
- France
- Gabon
- Georgia
- Grenada
- Guyana
- Haiti
- Indonesia
- Israel
- Kazakhstan
- Kenya
- Kiribati
- Kuwait
- Kyrgyzstan
- Lithuania
- Malawi
- Maldives
- Marshall Islands
- Mauritania
- Micronesia
- Moldova
- Monaco
- Mozambique
- Namibia
- Nauru
- Nigeria
- North Korea
- North Macedonia
- Oman
- Pakistan
- Palau
- Papua New Guinea
- Peru
- Saint Lucia
- Samoa
- San Marino
- Somalia
- South Sudan
- Sri Lanka
- Suriname
- Syria
- Tajikistan
- Thailand
- Timor-Leste
- Tonga
- Trinidad and Tobago
- Turkmenistan
- Tuvalu
- Uganda
- United Arab Emirates
- Uzbekistan
- Vanuatu
- Venezuela
- Zimbabwe

== See also ==
- International Seabed Authority
- Seabed warfare
