= HSU-001 =

Class of Chinese unmanned underwater vehicle

HSU-001 is a class of Chinese unmanned underwater vehicle. It is a large displacement unmanned underwater vehicle (LDUUV). The HSU-001 has limited endurance and is expected to be complemented by longer range UUVs in Chinese service.

The actual capabilities of HSU-001 are largely unknown. The HSU-001 is thought to be optimized for seabed warfare. Very little technical details of HSU-001 has been released to the public by the Chinese government, and as of early 2020s, only the following information is known:

- Length: 5 meter
- Diameter: 1 meter
- Weight: 3 ton

The HSU-001 was exhibited for the first time at the People’s Republic of China’s 70th anniversary parade in 2019.

== See also ==
- Orca (AUV)
- Hui Long-class UUV
