= Seabed warfare =

Undersea warfare which takes place on or in relation to the bottom of the ocean

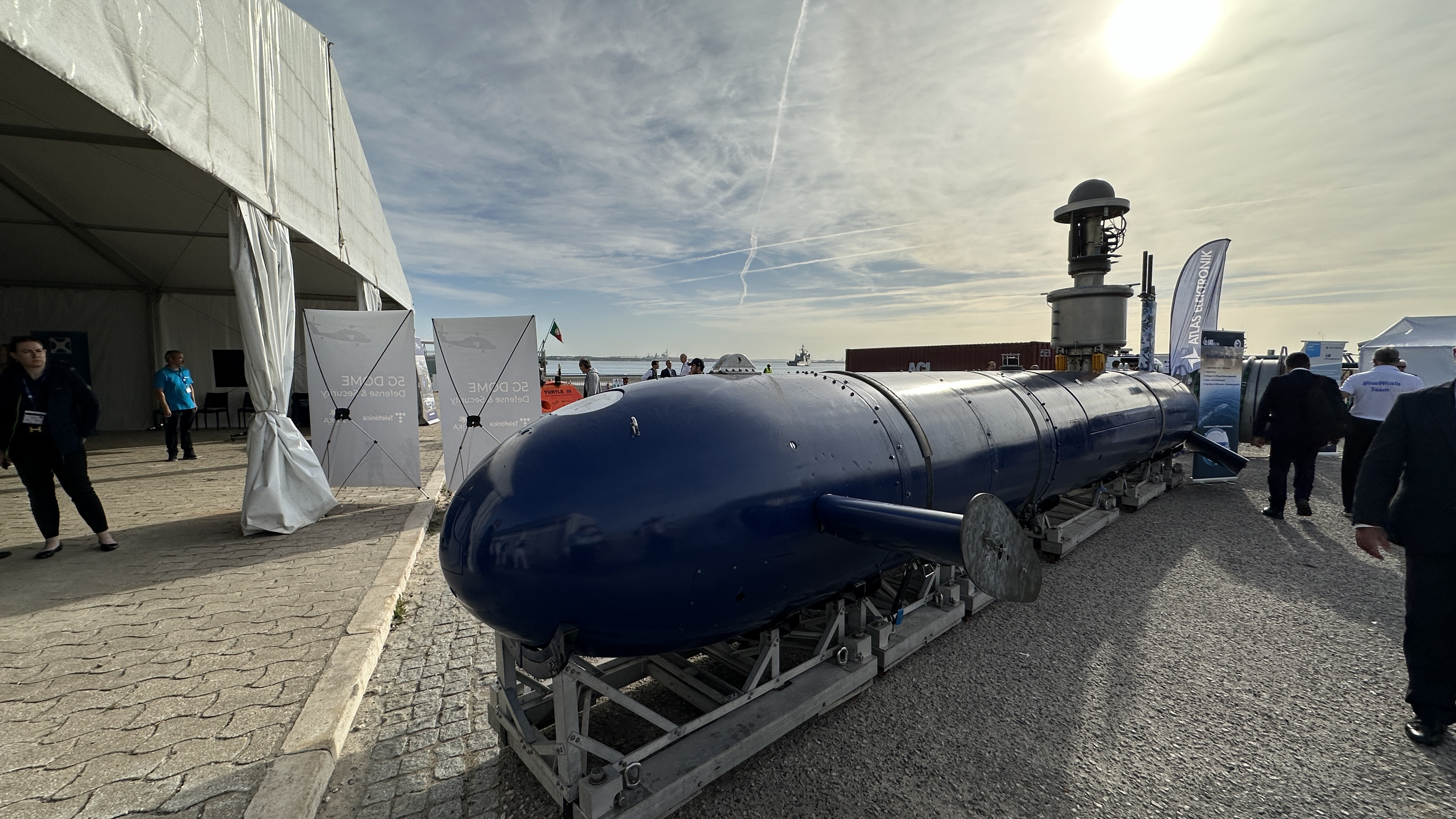
An unmanned underwater vehicle used to capture information.

Seabed warfare refers to military and other conflict activities conducted on, within, or beneath the seabed. It encompasses operations alongside wider undersea warfare that involve underwater infrastructure, seabed-based surveillance systems, and subsurface assets used for intelligence gathering, deterrence, or the protection of critical national and commercial resources.

This can include both defensive measures, such as safeguarding communications cables and energy pipelines, and offensive or coercive actions aimed at disabling or interfering with such systems.

The increasing importance of seabed warfare is closely linked to the rapid expansion of global subsea infrastructure. Submarine communication cables carry the majority of international data traffic, while offshore energy facilities, undersea pipelines, and emerging seabed technologies play a central role in global economic stability. As reliance on these systems has grown, so too has their strategic significance within national security planning.

Seabed warfare has been shaped by broader, complex geopolitical competition in 21st century maritime environments. Advances in underwater robotics, autonomous systems, sensor networks, and submarine capabilities have expanded the range of activities possible in deep-ocean settings. At the same time, the difficulty of monitoring and attributing actions on the seabed has contributed to its relevance within discussions of hybrid warfare, infrastructure resilience, and maritime domain awareness. As a result, seabed operations are increasingly considered a distinct and evolving component of modern naval strategy.

== Overview ==
Seabed warfare is defined as "operations to, from and across the ocean floor".

In general the target of seabed warfare is infrastructure in place on the seabed such as power cables, telecom cables, or natural resource extraction systems. Seabed warfare capabilities are expensive and because of that significant capabilities are only possessed by major powers.

Conflicts on the seabed can be both conventional and unconventional, the latter encompassing non-kinetic approaches such as lawfare.

France has integrated seabed warfare into their military strategy with the concept of Seabed Control Operations which involves expanding their existing mine warfare and hydro-oceanography capabilities to deal with a more comprehensive spectrum of threats.

In December 2023, it was reported that six northern European countries would establish a Seabed Security Experimentation Center, which would help develop new techniques, to better protect their key undersea infrastructure against threats. That same month it was also announced that the Netherlands would invest up to 250 million euros on measures to protect its cables and pipelines in the North Sea against sabotage and espionage.

== Platforms ==
The American Block VI Virginia-class submarines will include the organic ability to employ seabed warfare equipment.

The Russian submarine Losharik is thought to be capable of seabed warfare.

The Chinese HSU-001 is a small UUV, speculated to be optimized for seabed warfare.

== See also ==
- Naval mine
- SOSUS
- Anti-submarine warfare
- Seabed Arms Control Treaty
