= Echo Voyager =

Autonomous underwater vehicle built by Boeing

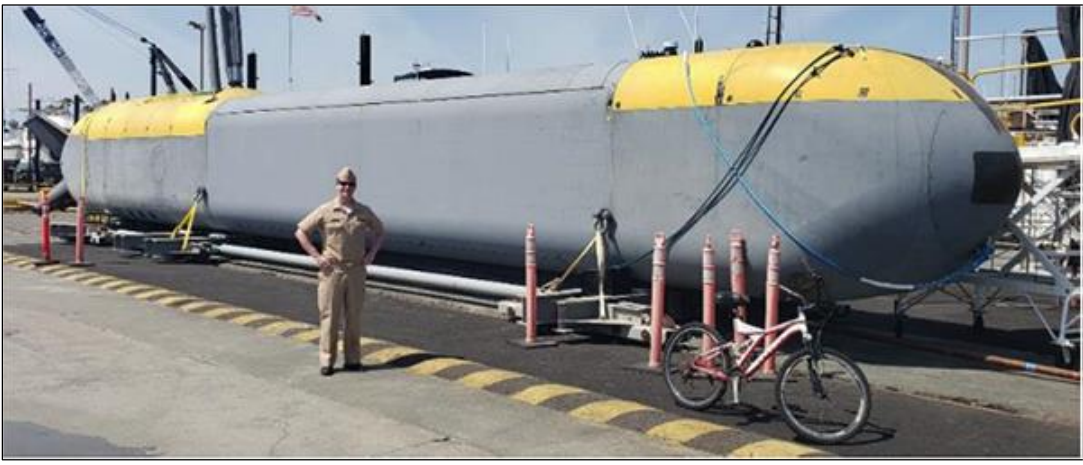
Boeing echo voyager

Echo Voyager is an autonomous underwater vehicle (AUV) built by Boeing.

Design work on Echo Voyager began at Boeing Phantom Works in 2011 with the goal of improving upon earlier AUV designs that required a crewed support ship due to an endurance of only a few days and a range of several hundred miles. Echo Voyager is intended to operate extended deep-sea missions at a depth of up to 11,000 feet (3,400 m), with a range of up to 7,500 miles (12,100 km) and an endurance of six months. Echo Voyager is powered by a hybrid diesel-electric system—submerged, the vehicle uses batteries for propulsion, which are recharged by a diesel-powered generator while it is surfaced. The system has a power output of about 18 kilowatts (24 hp), and allows Echo Voyager to travel submerged for several days at a time at up to 9 miles per hour (7.8 kn). The 51 feet (16 m) vessel is designed to be adaptable to either military or commercial use, with a payload bay that measures 30 feet (9.1 m) by 8.5 feet (2.6 m).

Echo Voyager was built at Boeing's Phantom Works facility in Huntington Beach in partnership with Huntington Ingalls Industries. Testing in an onshore pool occurred in early 2016, and the first ocean tests off the California coast in the San Pedro Bay and near the Palos Verdes Peninsula ran from April through June 2017 to test the vehicle's basic operational systems. Beginning in May 2018 and continuing for several more months, Boeing dispatched Echo Voyager on longer deep-sea tests that focused on the craft's ability to operate fully autonomously. In February 2019, Boeing won a $43 million contract from the United States Navy for four Orca AUVs based on the design of Echo Voyager.
