= BlueWhale (UUV) =

Israeli unmanned underwater vehicle

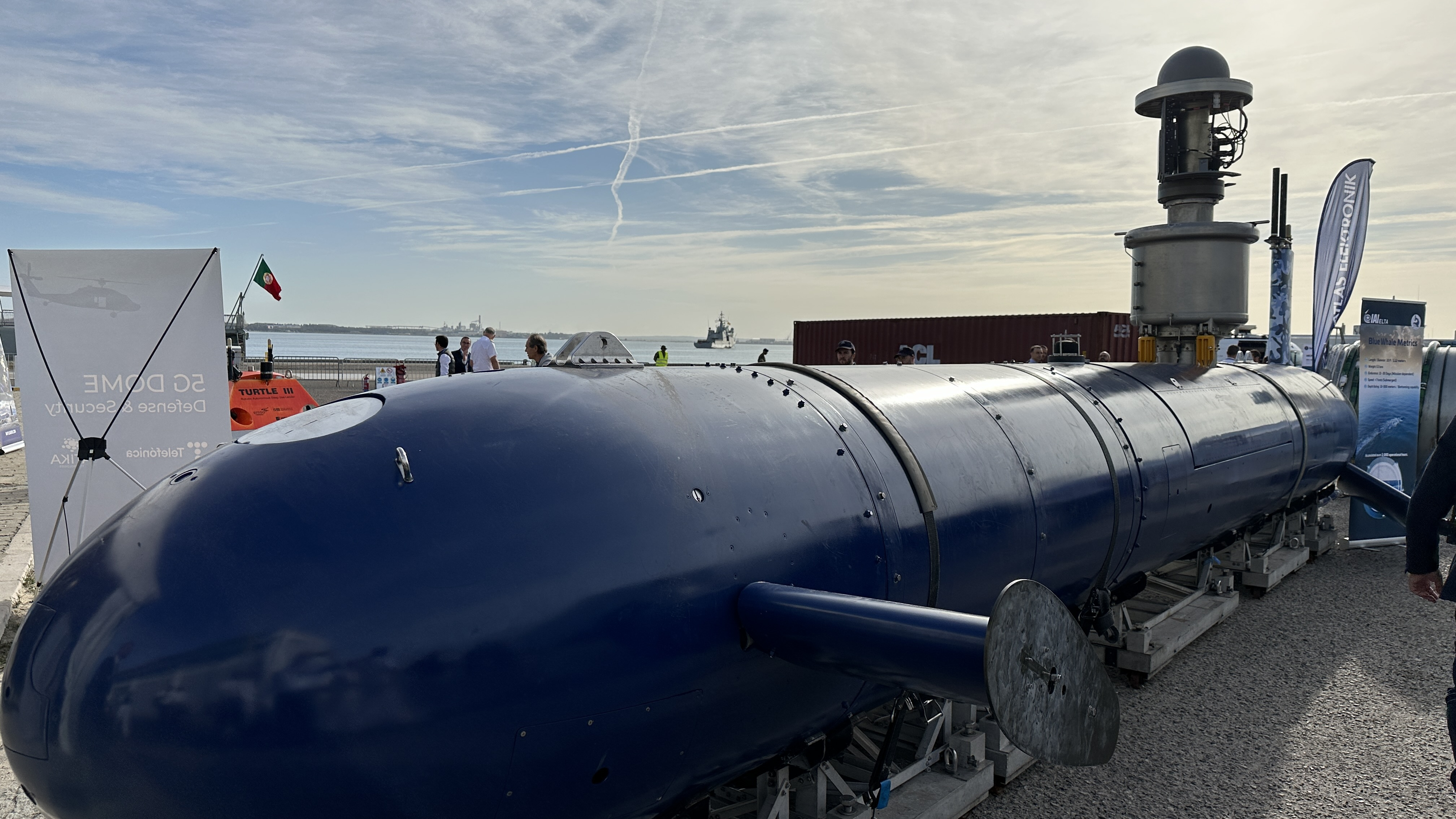
BlueWhale UUV

The BlueWhale, designated ELI-3325, is an unmanned underwater vehicle (UUV) manufactured by a joint venture of the Israeli defense firm ELTA Systems and Atlas Elektronik. It is used to gather information using radar, SIGINT and communications technologies. It made its public debut at the International Maritime Defence Exhibition (IMDEX) Asia 2025 defence expo in Singapore on 6-8 May 2025.

== Mission ==
It is used for intelligence gathering, surveillance and reconnaissance (ISR), including covert operations in coastal areas, anti-submarine warfare (ASW) - hunting submarines in its own territory, acoustic reconnaissance (ACINT), covert mine detection and other mine countermeasures (Mine Counter Measures, MCM), support to special forces including reconnaissance and mine detectors, reconnaissance and patrol for conventional submarines (Loyal Submarine Wingman), intelligence on piracy, terrorism, and illegal migration, and is intended to support maritime expeditions.

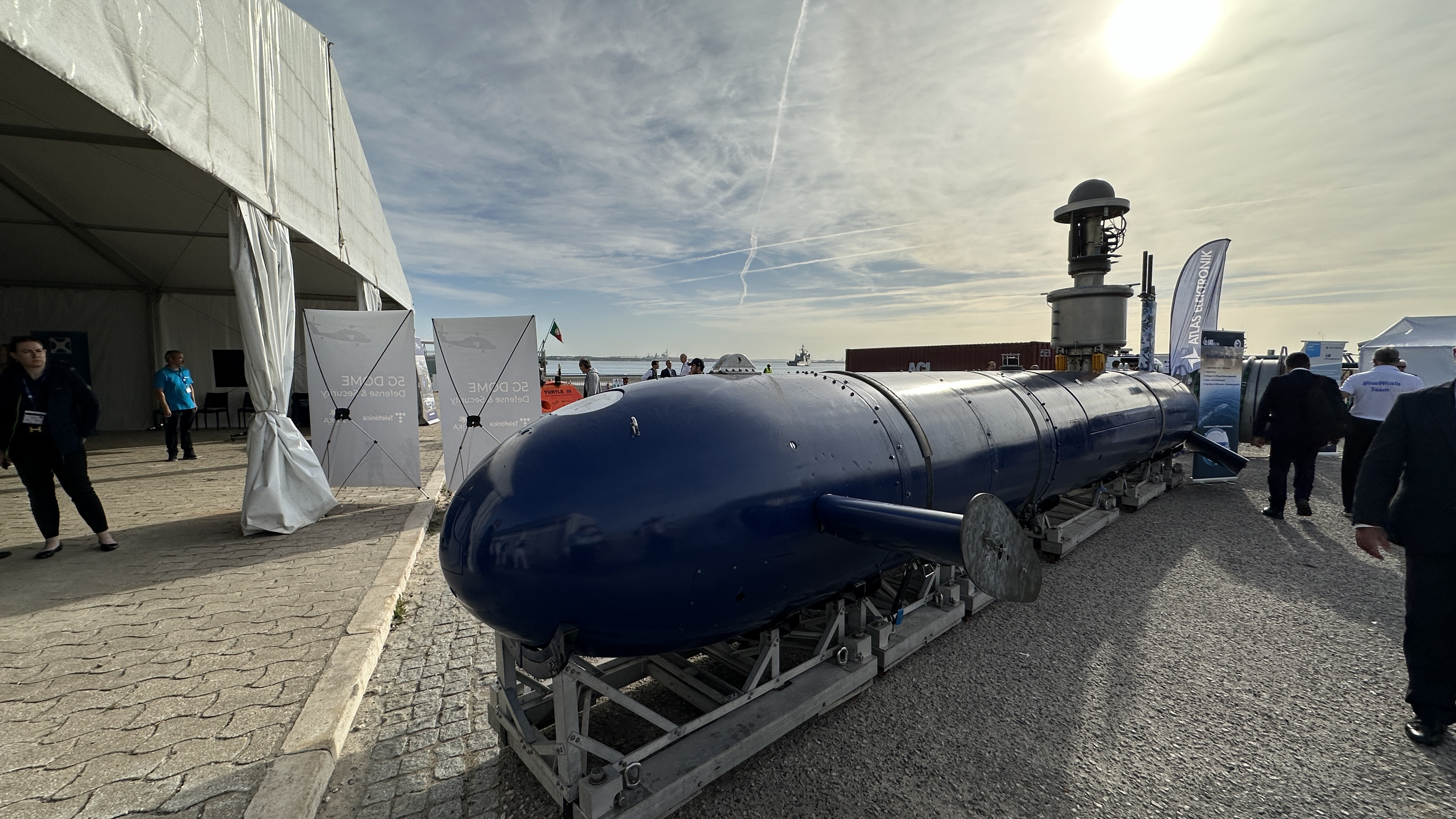
BlueWhale UUV

== Technical data ==
The boat is 10.9 meters long and weighs 5.5 tons. It sails silently and stays at sea for up to four weeks. It travels at 7 knots underwater, dives 300 meters deep and carries a watertight patented mast for surface payload. The mast can carry antennas, including SATCOM, for real-time data link with mission control.

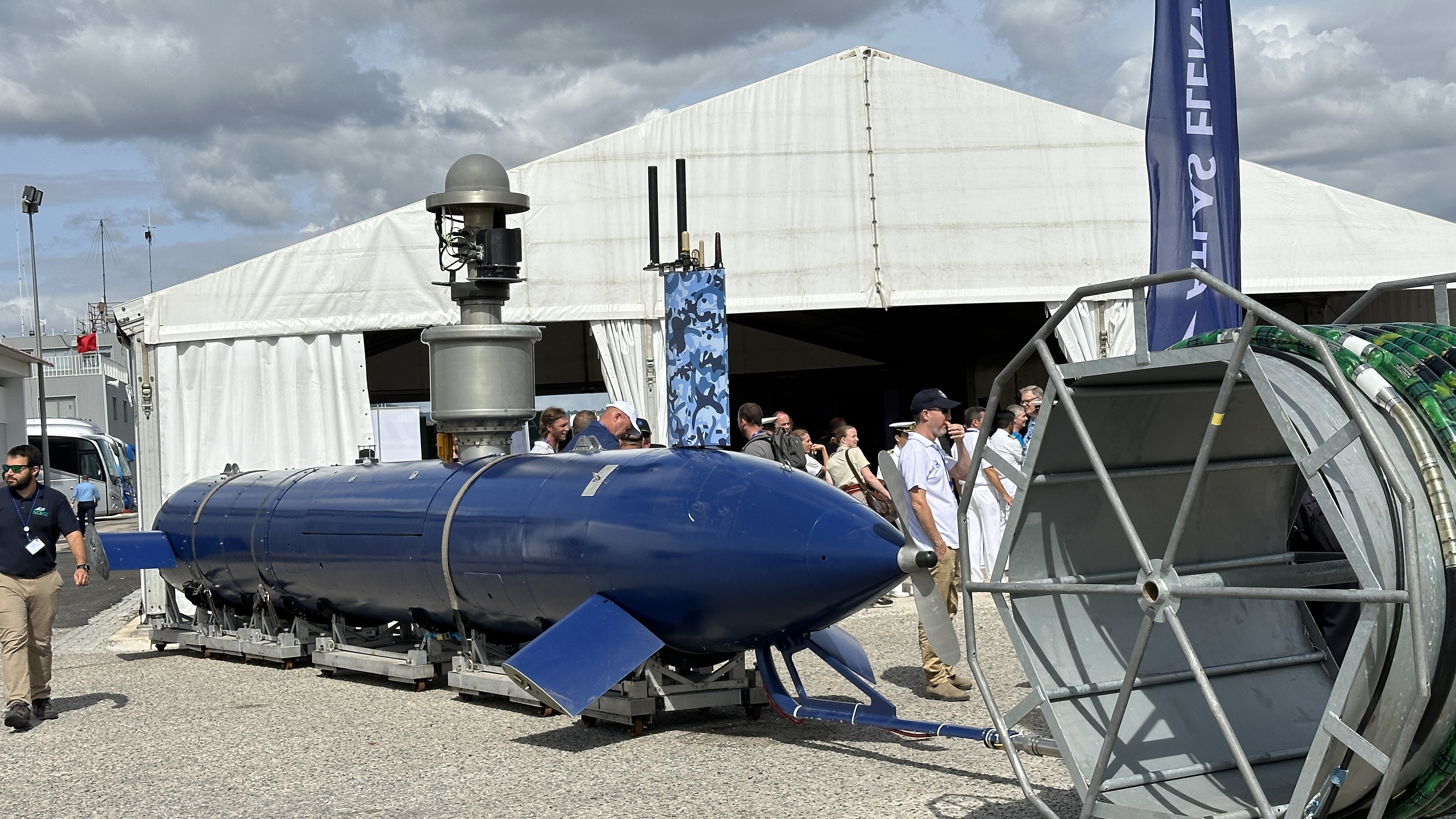
BlueWhale UUV

Possible payloads: Radar, day/night EO/IR, COMINT/ELINT/ESM.

Underwater sensors: TAS (Towed Array Sonar) developed by Atlas Elektronik, Active and passive Flank Array Sonar (FAS) for detection of ships and submarines, Synthetic Aperture Sonar (SAS) for mine detection and high resolution seabed mapping, developed by KRAKEN; Magnetic sensors for verification of mine detection.

== Operational history ==
The BlueWhale UUV performed several tests and demonstrations with Israeli and foreign naval forces, including a first demonstration to Portuguese Navy and NATO naval forces during the annual REPMUS and Dynamic Messenger exercises in 2023. It also underwent a comprehensive operational evaluation with the German Navy in the Baltic Sea in late 2024. In May 2025, IAI and HAI signed an MOU to offer the BlueWhale to the Hellenic Navy.
