= Project Cetus =

British crewless submarine programme

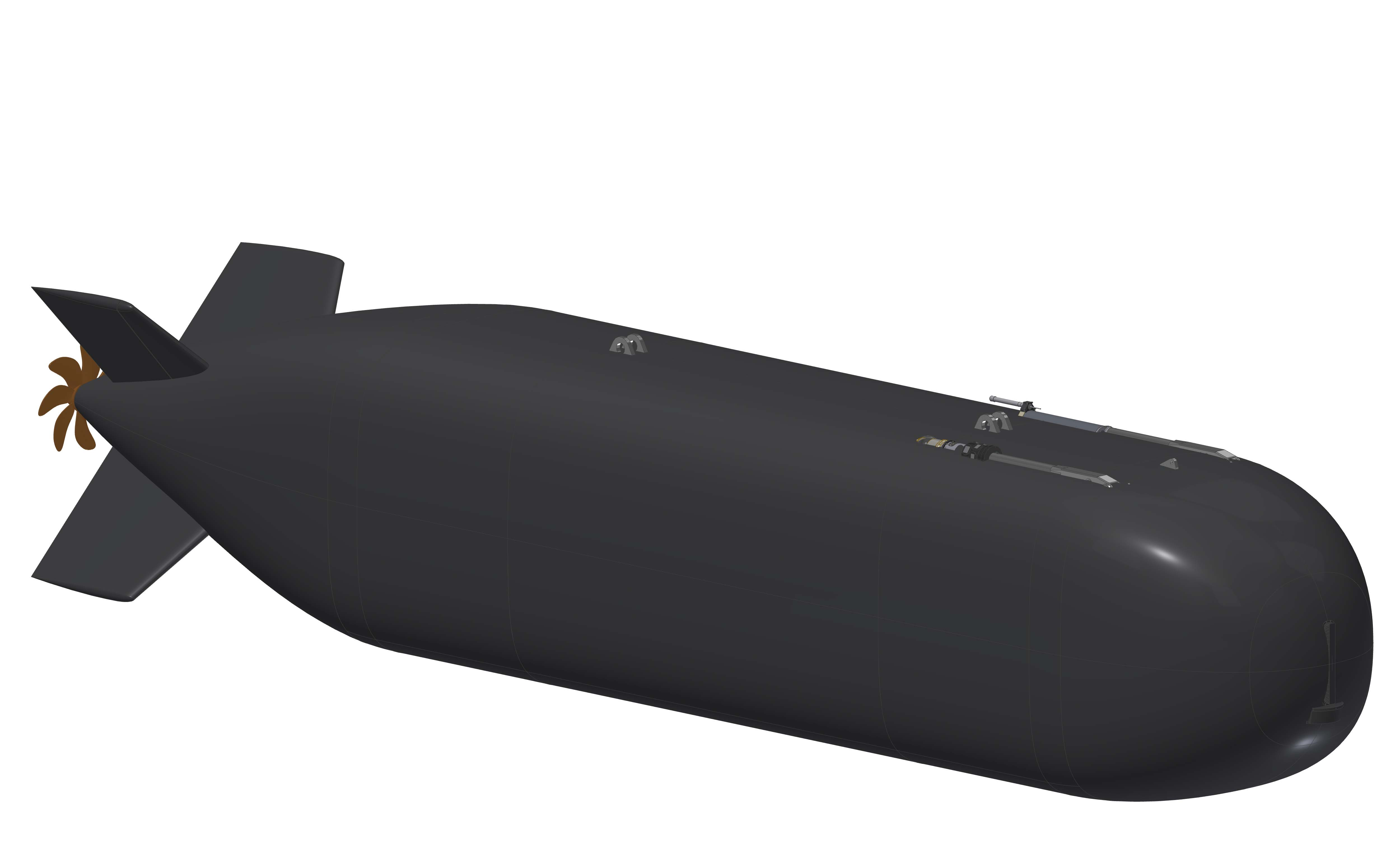
- Design of CETUS

History

United Kingdom
- Name: XV Excalibur
- Namesake: Excalibur; HMS Excalibur
- Ordered: 1 December 2022
- Builder: MSubs, Plymouth
- Cost: £15.4 million
- Launched: February 2025
- Christened: 15 May 2025, HMNB Devonport
- Acquired: 11 December 2025
- Home port: Turnchapel Wharf, Plymouth
- Status: In trials

General characteristics
- Class & type: Extra-large uncrewed underwater vehicle (XLUUV)
- Type: Experimental / demonstrator
- Displacement: 19 t (19 long tons) (approx.)
- Length: 12 m (39 ft)
- Beam: 2 m (6.6 ft)
- Crew: None (uncrewed)
- Sensors & processing systems: Modular payload bay
- Armament: None
- Notes: Operated by MSubs on behalf of the Royal Navy within the Fleet Experimentation Squadron

Project Cetus is a United Kingdom programme to develop and trial an extra-large uncrewed underwater vehicle (XLUUV) for the Royal Navy. Named after Cetus, a mythological sea monster, the project was funded through the Royal Navy's Anti-Submarine Warfare Spearhead programme and delivered by the Submarine Delivery Agency (SDA), with the vehicle designed and built by Plymouth-based company MSubs.

The resulting vessel was launched in February 2025 and formally named Experimental Vessel (XV) Excalibur in May 2025. Ownership passed to the Royal Navy in December 2025, and the vessel is operated as an experimental platform within the Fleet Experimentation Squadron.

== Background ==
The Royal Navy launched a competition for an 8–12 metre XLUUV in early 2022, with the aim of acquiring the first extra-large autonomous submersible to be owned and operated by the service. In December 2022 the Ministry of Defence announced that a £15.4 million contract had been awarded to MSubs of Plymouth to design and build the vehicle. The project was described as a testbed intended to "build trust in autonomy" and to assess military payloads and missions.

The vehicle was designed and built from scratch and is managed on the Royal Navy's behalf by the SDA's Autonomy Unit. The programme was planned to span around six years, with the vessel used for trials and experimentation until at least 2027.

== Design ==
XV Excalibur is 12 metres long, 2 metres wide and displaces approximately 19 tonnes, making it the largest uncrewed underwater vehicle trialled by the Royal Navy. It is reported to be able to dive deeper than any crewed Royal Navy submarine. The vessel carries no crew and no armament, with the internal volume given over to a modular payload bay for sensors and mission equipment. Navy Lookout described it as the largest and most complex uncrewed submersible operated by any European navy at the time of its launch.

== Development and launch ==
Sea trials had originally been hoped to begin in November 2024, but the project ran several months behind schedule; Defence Minister Maria Eagle stated that the delay was due to an amendment to the vessel's original design. The vehicle was lowered into the water at the Turnchapel Wharf Centre of Maritime Autonomy in Plymouth at the end of February 2025.

On 15 May 2025 the vessel was unveiled at HMNB Devonport and formally named XV Excalibur, a reference both to the Arthurian sword and to HMS Excalibur, an experimental high-speed submarine operated by the Royal Navy in the 1950s and 1960s. Representatives of the AUKUS partnership attended the ceremony.

== Trials and operations ==
=== Exercise Talisman Sabre 2025 ===
In July 2025, during Exercise Talisman Sabre, XV Excalibur was remotely operated while submerged in UK waters from a remote operations centre in Australia, more than 10,000 miles from its base in Plymouth. The demonstration formed part of the AUKUS Pillar 2 "Maritime Big Play" series and was described as the first time the UK and Australia had demonstrated XLUUV interchangeability as a single force.

=== Quantum clock trial ===
Excalibur subsequently went to sea carrying a "Tiqker" quantum optical atomic clock developed by the UK company Infleqtion, reported as the first time such a device had been operated at sea aboard an underwater vessel. Because submerged vessels cannot rely on GPS, a more stable onboard clock could allow uncrewed submarines to remain submerged for longer while maintaining an accurate navigational position.

=== Handover to the Royal Navy ===
On 11 December 2025 the SDA announced that XV Excalibur had been handed over to the Royal Navy following the completion of acceptance trials, during which the vessel was reported to have exceeded several of its original design specifications. The vessel was expected to spend the following two years on sea trials to explore the challenges of operating an uncrewed vessel of its size. The handover was framed as a transition from a development programme to an operationally-oriented test platform intended to inform future doctrine, training and procurement under the Royal Navy's Atlantic Bastion concept.

=== 2026 trials contract ===
In June 2026 the SDA awarded MSubs a £6.68 million contract to support the vessel's trials programme, with a contract notice published on 25 June confirming the deal signed the previous day. The trials are to be conducted from MSubs' facilities in Plymouth and in nearby waters, running through to 2028, and will focus on platform and payload trials. Although owned by the Royal Navy, Excalibur is operated by MSubs on the Navy's behalf under an arrangement described as closer to a government-owned, contractor-operated model than a conventional support contract. The vessel forms part of the Fleet Experimentation Squadron alongside the surface trials ship XV Patrick Blackett. On September 13 Excalibur launched a U.S. Mark 48 torpedo as part of joint-American/British tests at the British Underwater Test & Evaluation Centre in Scotland.

== Future development ==
Project Cetus is regarded as a stepping stone towards the Royal Navy acquiring a larger fleet of XLUUVs to supplement its attack submarine force, and to de-risk technologies that could be included in the future SSN-AUKUS design. Under Project CABOT the Royal Navy is seeking a fleet of XLUUVs, referred to as the "Type 93 Chariot", to patrol the GIUK gap in conjunction with uncrewed surface vessels designated "Type 92 Sloop", as part of the NATO anti-submarine warfare barrier initiative. Lessons from Excalibur's trials are expected to feed into both CABOT and the wider Atlantic Bastion undersea-monitoring initiative announced in December 2025. Officials have stated that Excalibur remains a demonstrator rather than an operational warship and will not undertake combat duties.

== Gallery ==
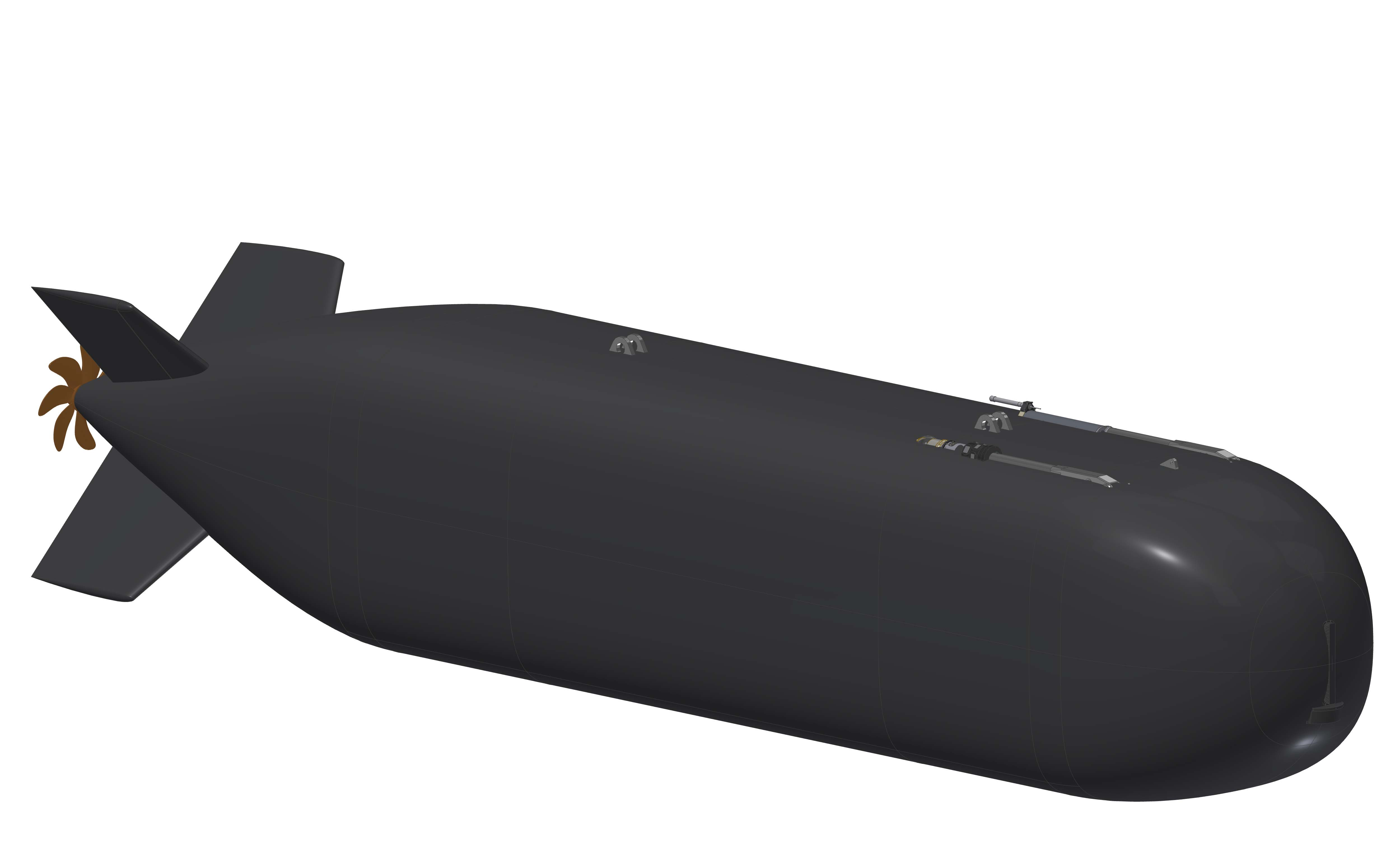

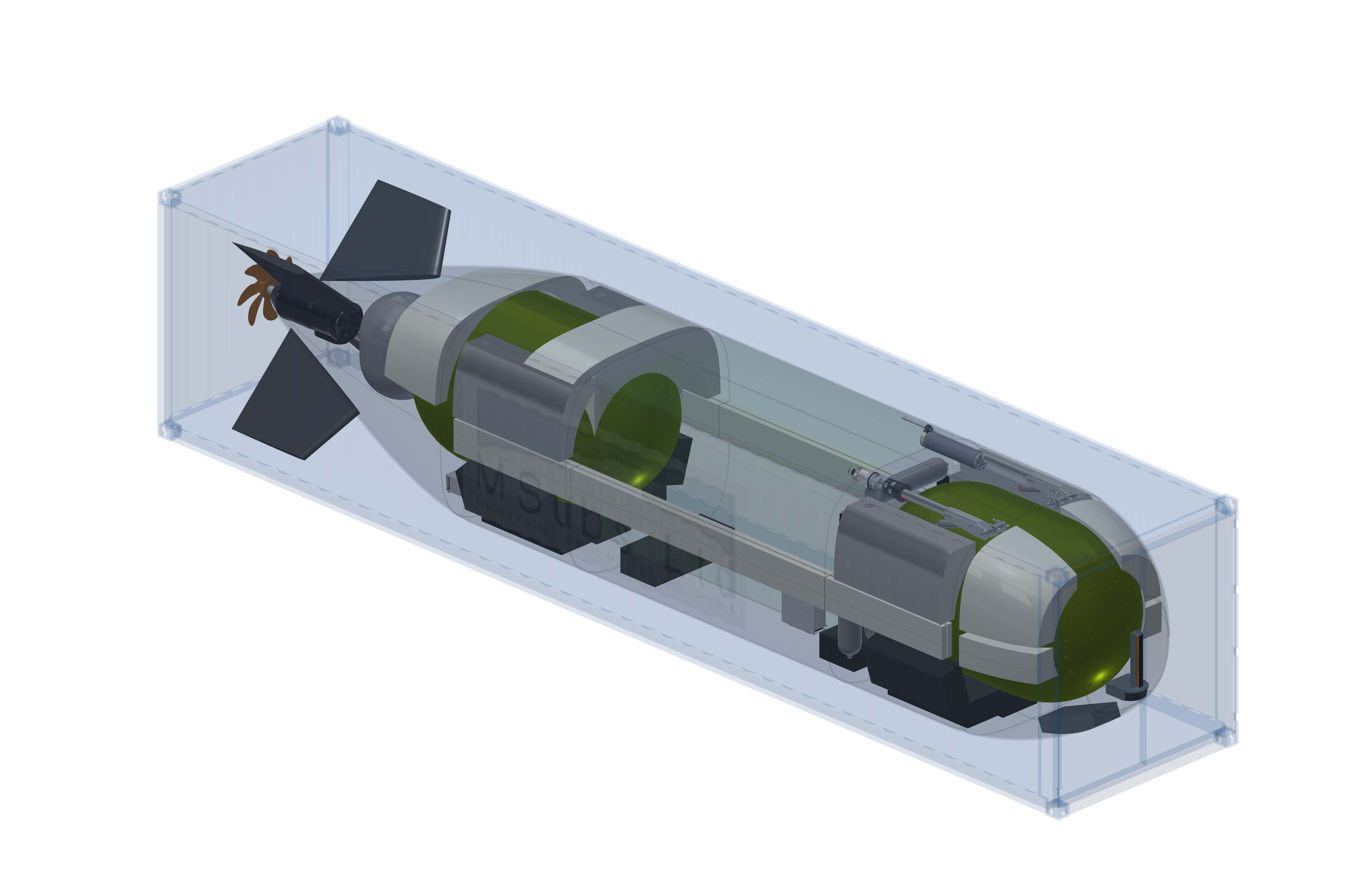

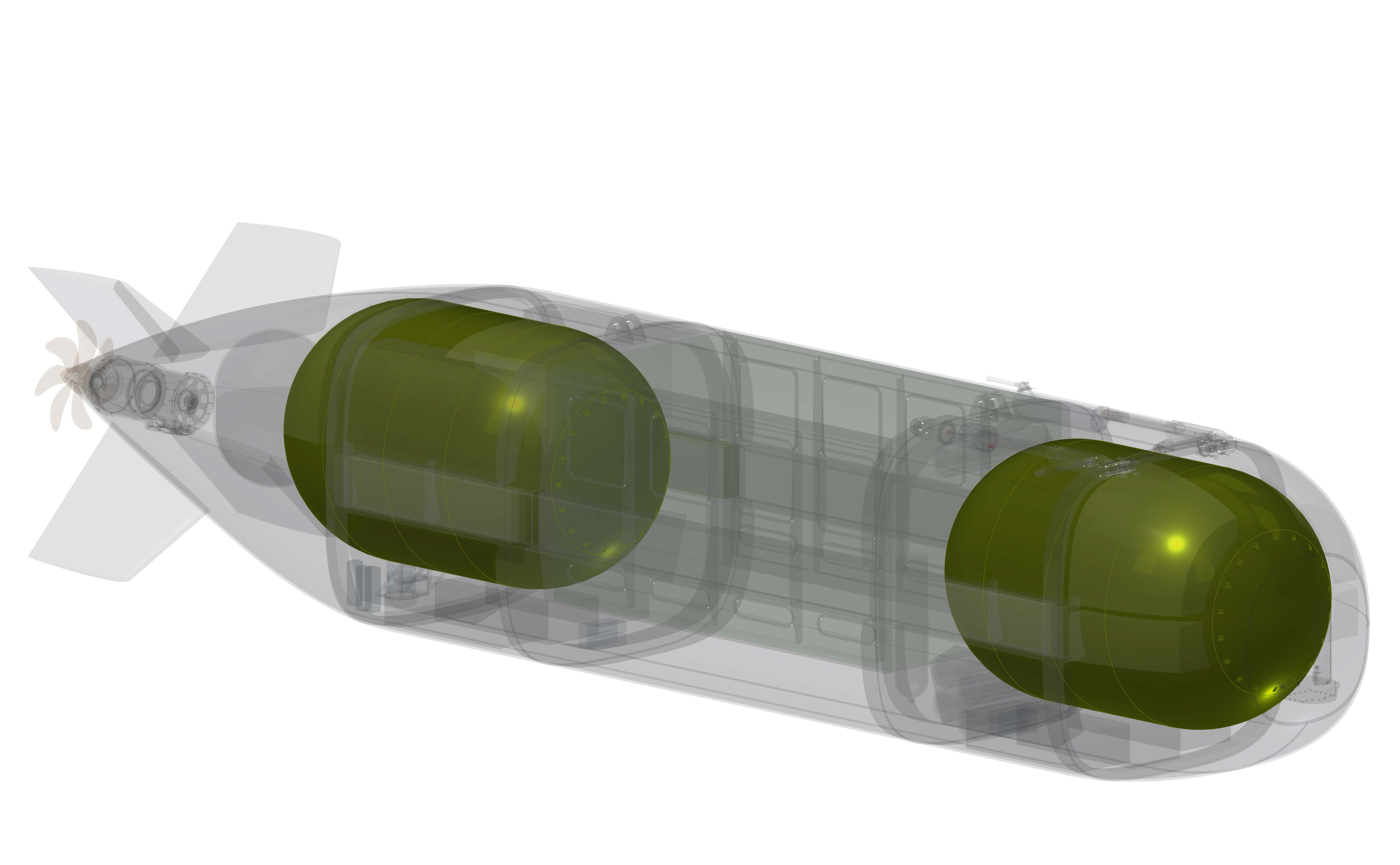

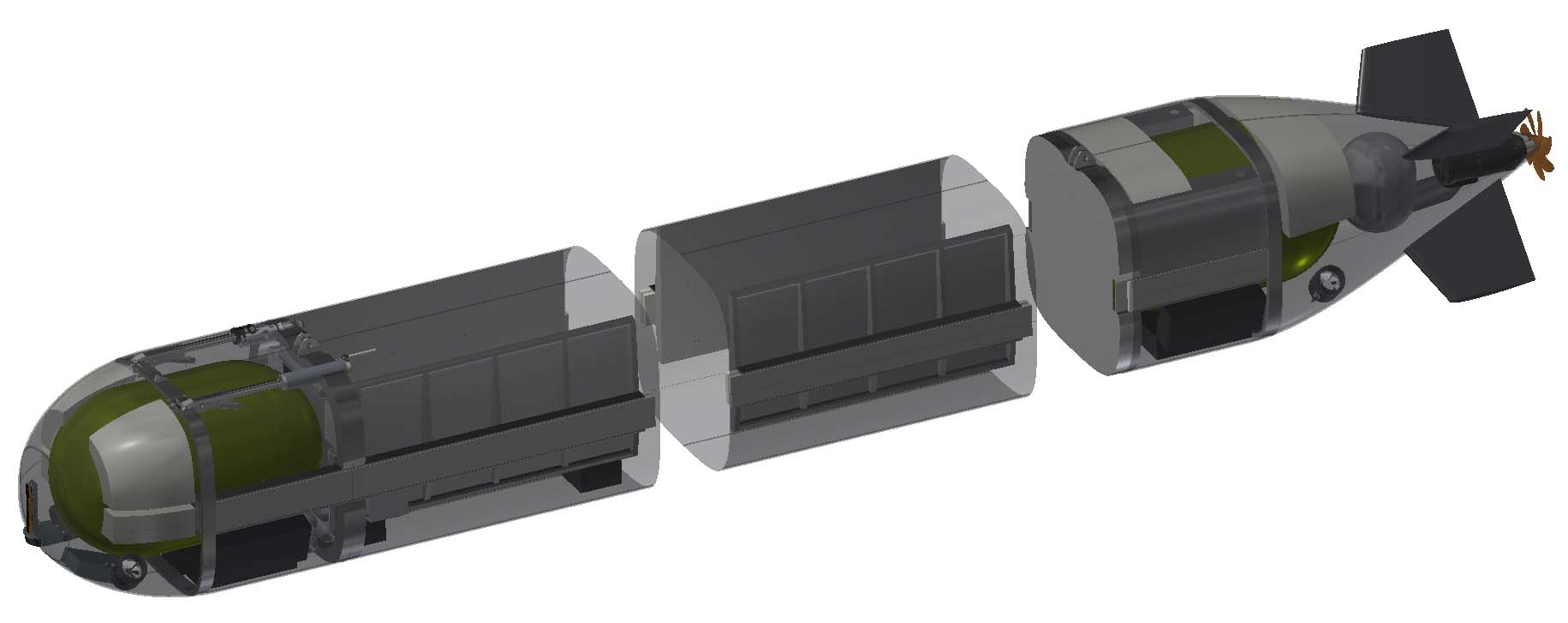

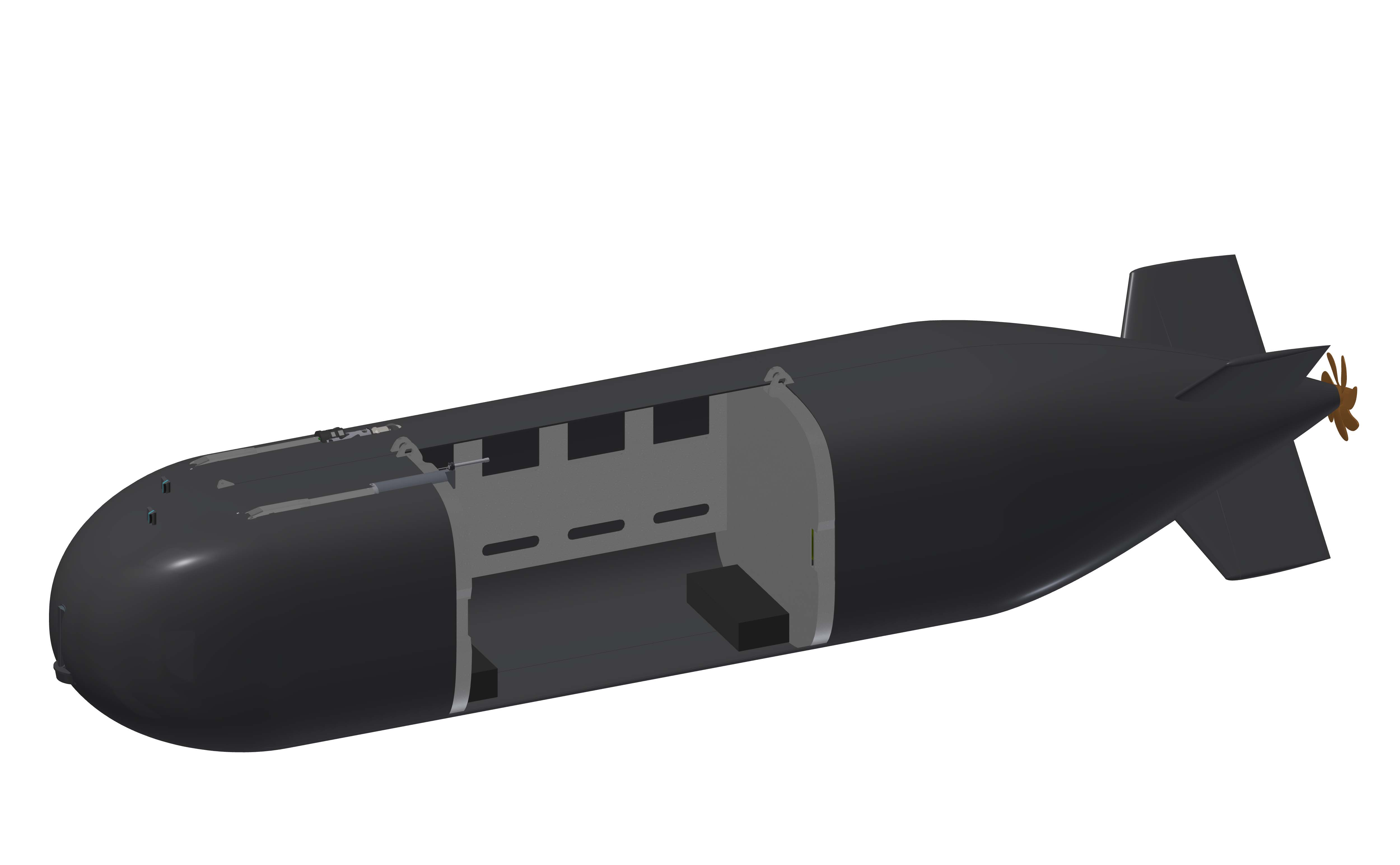

== See also ==
- Ghost Shark – Royal Australian Navy XLUUV programme
- XV Patrick Blackett
- Submarine Delivery Agency
