= Unmanned underwater vehicle =

Submersible vehicles that can operate underwater without a human occupant

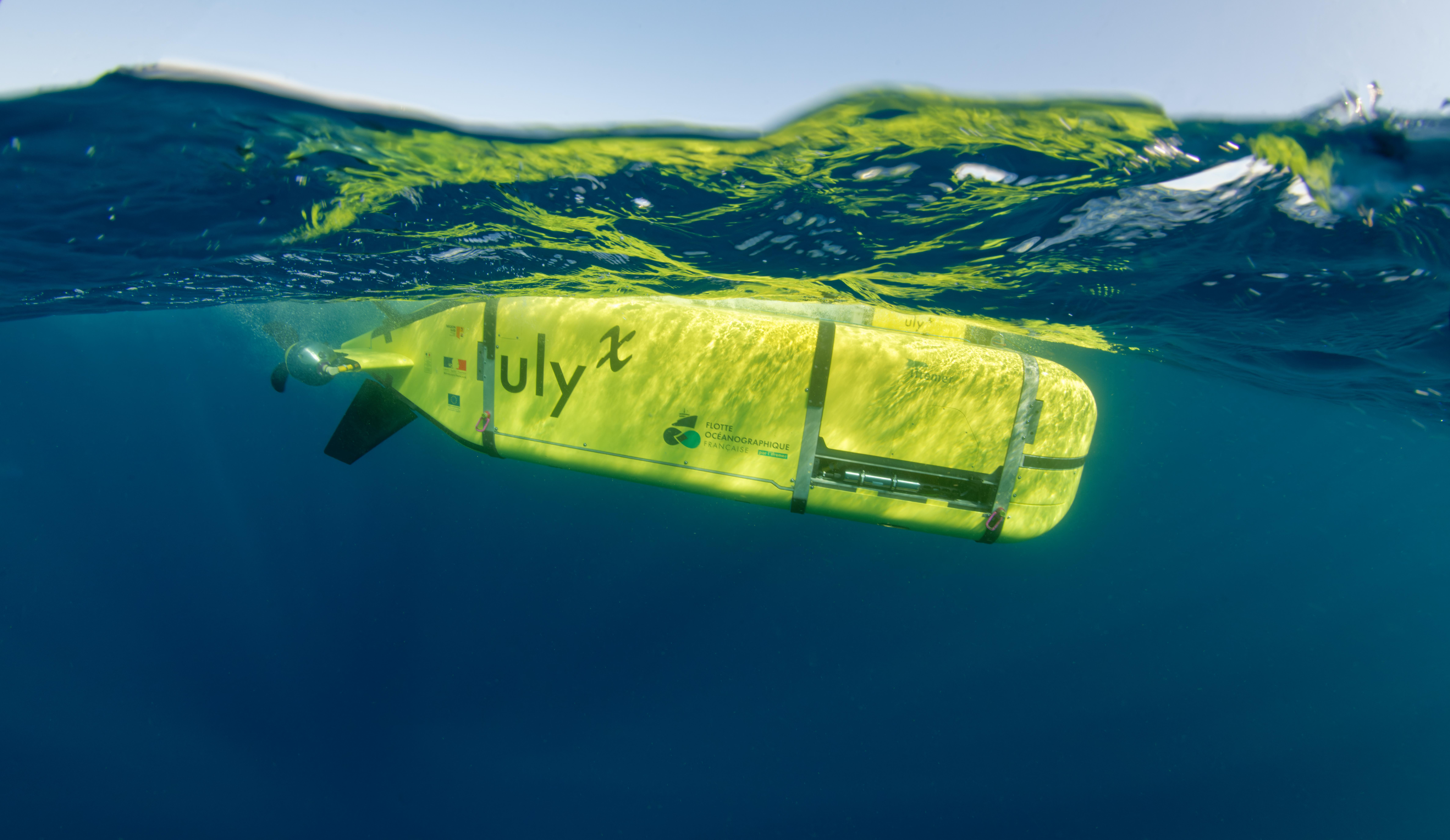
Uly^{x} autonomous underwater vehicle

Unmanned underwater vehicles (UUV), also known as underwater drones, or unmanned submarines, are submersible vehicles that can operate underwater without a human occupant, either remotely operated underwater vehicles (ROUVs) or autonomous underwater vehicles (AUVs).

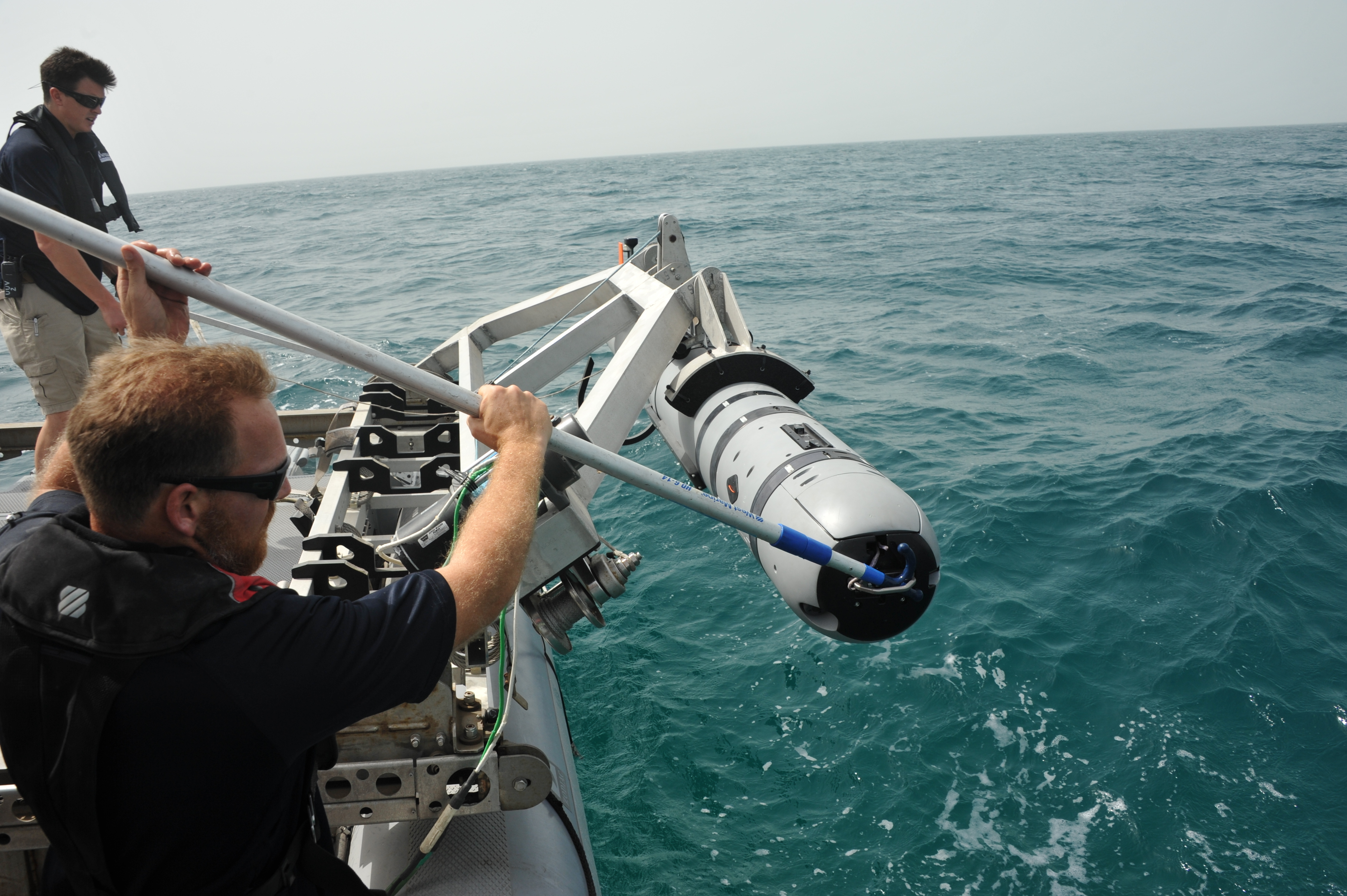
The uncrewed underwater vehicle is about to take on drive.

== Classifications ==
=== Remotely operated underwater vehicle ===
Remotely operated underwater vehicles (ROUVs) primarily replace humans in difficult underwater conditions and perform educational or industrial missions. They are manually controlled to perform tasks that include surveillance and patrolling. ROUVs cannot operate autonomously. In addition to a camera, actuators, and sensors, ROUVs often include a 'gripper' or something to grasp objects with. This may throw off the weight distribution of the vehicle, requiring manual assistance at all times. Sometimes ROUVs require additional assistance due to the importance of the task being performed. The US Navy developed a Submarine Rescue Diving Recompression System (SRDRS) that can save up to 16 people up to 2000 feet underwater at a time. Such a large vehicle with the primary role of saving lives requires an operator(s).

=== Autonomous underwater vehicle ===
Autonomous underwater vehicles (AUVs) are underwater vehicles that can operate without an operator. Sizes can range from just a few kilograms up to thousands of kilograms. The first AUV was created in 1957 to perform research in arctic waters for the Applied Physics Laboratory at the University of Washington. By the early 2000s, 10 different AUVs had been developed, including screw driven AUVs, underwater gliders, and Bionic AUVs. The earliest models used screw propeller thrusters while more recent models use automatic buoyancy control. The earliest model, SPURV, weighed 484 kg, went as deep as 3650 meters, and could travel for up to 5.5 hours. One of the most recent models, Deepglider, weighs 62 kg, can go as deep as 6000 meters, and can travel up to 8500 km.

== History ==
=== 1950s ===
Starting in 1957, the first uncrewed underwater vehicle (UUV) was classified as an autonomous underwater vehicle (AUV), and was created in the United States to research the Arctic waters. The Special Purpose Underwater Research Vehicle (SPURV), was used by the University of Washington to collect oceanographic data until 1979 during which the development of SPURV II began to provide better movement performance and better sensing capabilities.

=== 1970s ===
Scientists from the Autonomous and Control Processes Institute took interest in the developments of the AUV “SCAT” which led to the introduction of the UUVs “L1” and “L2” in 1974. “L1” and “L2” are AUV models used for the further development of technology and oceanographic mapping respectively.

=== 1980s ===
Further development of the Remotely operated Vehicle (ROV) brought forth the creation of the Autonomous and Remote controlled submarine (ARCS) in 1983 by the ISE ltd. company in partnership with the “International Submarine Engineering”. ARCS was also classified as a Remotely controlled underwater vehicle (ROUV) because of its 32-bit Motorola processor which allowed for the remote control it featured. This UUV further served as a testing platform, improving on the battery life, navigational, and communicational systems having its first dive in 1987.

=== 1990s ===
When the Russian Institute of Marine Technology Problems introduced the Solar Autonomous underwater vehicle (SAUV), it was the start of longer term exploration missions without the need of retrieving the UUV for maintenance. The introduction of solar panels on UUVs began with the SAUV in 1987 and was kept during the making of SAUV II. Solar panels enabled lengthier missions, with the ability to use features such as gps and high payloads more frequently due to its ease of charge.

Advancements in battery life enabled for the creation of “gliders” in 1995 which would allow for the long term dives in which the UUVs would remain submerged for weeks or even months at a time.

=== 2000s ===
UUVs begin to be taken into consideration for more than testing tools for other underwater missions due to the increase number of user internationally. There was also an increase in funding for the UUV technology development. The rise in users internationally led to the increase demand for UUV technology outside of government agencies and the commercial sale of UUVs started, expanding the research based use of the UUV to a more industrial/commercial based use.

==== 2016 incident ====
On December 16, 2016, a Chinese warship in South China Sea seized an underwater drone that was in the process of being retrieved by the U.S. Navy survey ship USNS Bowditch. A day later, the Chinese Defense Ministry said it will return the drone to the United States. The Pentagon confirmed that and says the drone, used for gathering weather and temperature data, is not armed. The drone was returned several days later.

=== 2020s ===
In early 2023, following successful military use of uncrewed surface vehicles (USV) by Ukraine in the Black Sea in October and November 2022, the Ukrainian Navy began to employ an uncrewed underwater vehicle (UUV), a maritime drone, called the Toloka TLK-150. A small robotic submarine, the TLK-150 is 2.5 m (8 ft 2 in) long, with twin thrusters mounted on wing-like stabilizers. Although "smaller than previous Ukrainian maritime drones [and with a] much shorter range and slower speed, [it] should make up for that by being more stealthy and more survivable. An advanced version has a range of 2000 kilometres and a payload approaching 5000 kg of explosives and has been effective in destroying vessels and infrastructure such as the Kerch Bridge.

TLK-150 is developed by Brave1, which has designs for two larger UUVs. The TLK-400 is longer at 4–6 m (13–20 ft) and "has a much larger diameter body inferring greater range and payload. The TLK-1000 would be much larger again, up to 12 meters (40 feet) in length and with four thrusters."

In April 2024, Ukraine has announced that it was testing an “uncrewed submarine” that can be fitted with a warhead, stealth features and sensors, carry up to 10 divers, carry six torpedoes or missiles and has an endurance of 54 hours/1000 km, with a speed of up to 50 km/h underwater.

In May 2024, Northrop Grumman unveiled an underwater drone named the Manta Ray, developed for the Defense Advanced Research Projects Agency (DARPA). Modeled after the manta ray, this drone underwent four years of development to mimic the movements of this oceanic creature. The product is engineered for extended-duration and long-range military operations with minimal human intervention. Additionally, it features the capability to harness energy from the ocean. Manta Ray successfully completed full-scale at-sea trials off the coast of Southern California in February and March 2024. According to DARPA, Manta Ray demonstrates a first-of-its-kind capability for an extra-large UUV due to its "cross-country modular transportation, in-field assembly, and subsequent deployment."

In April 2025, Anduril Industries announced their Copperhead (UUV) family of autonomous unmanned underwater vehicles, which includes a loitering munition.

In December 2025, Ukraine claimed that it conducted a military operation that struck a Russian submarine with underwater drones. The SBU said that the operation was the first of its kind. The submarine was struck in the port of Novorossiysk, a heavliy protected port.

== Design ==
=== Gliders ===
External fins perpendicular to the frame of the UUV which allowed for a linear movement of the UUV and deeper, controlled dives. These gliders use buoyancy derived propulsion which increases the duration of dives and their range through up and down movement in the ocean.

=== Manta ray ===
In September 2021, researchers at a Chinese university developed a manta ray shaped UUV with the purpose of collecting information around the Paracel Islands. Some UUVs are designed to mimic the silhouettes of animals to facilitate movement and prevent detection. The manta ray design allows the UUV to camouflage with the marine life and contributes to the ease at which the craft swims through water.

In May 2024, Northrop Grumman revealed an underwater drone named the Manta Ray. The drone, built for DARPA, has been under development since 2020. The Manta Ray, along with the Orca developed by Boeing, represents a new class of uncrewed underwater vehicles (UUVs), that were developed to perform long duration, long range military missions with as little human oversight as possible. The Manta Ray is also capable of harvesting energy from the ocean.

=== Oxygen/hydrogen air-independent propulsion ===
UUVs with combustion engines are oxygen dependent vehicles which require to resurface. With the development of a propulsion unit that does not require oxygen or hydrogen, the ability for the UUV to stay continuously underwater increases drastically.

== Applications ==
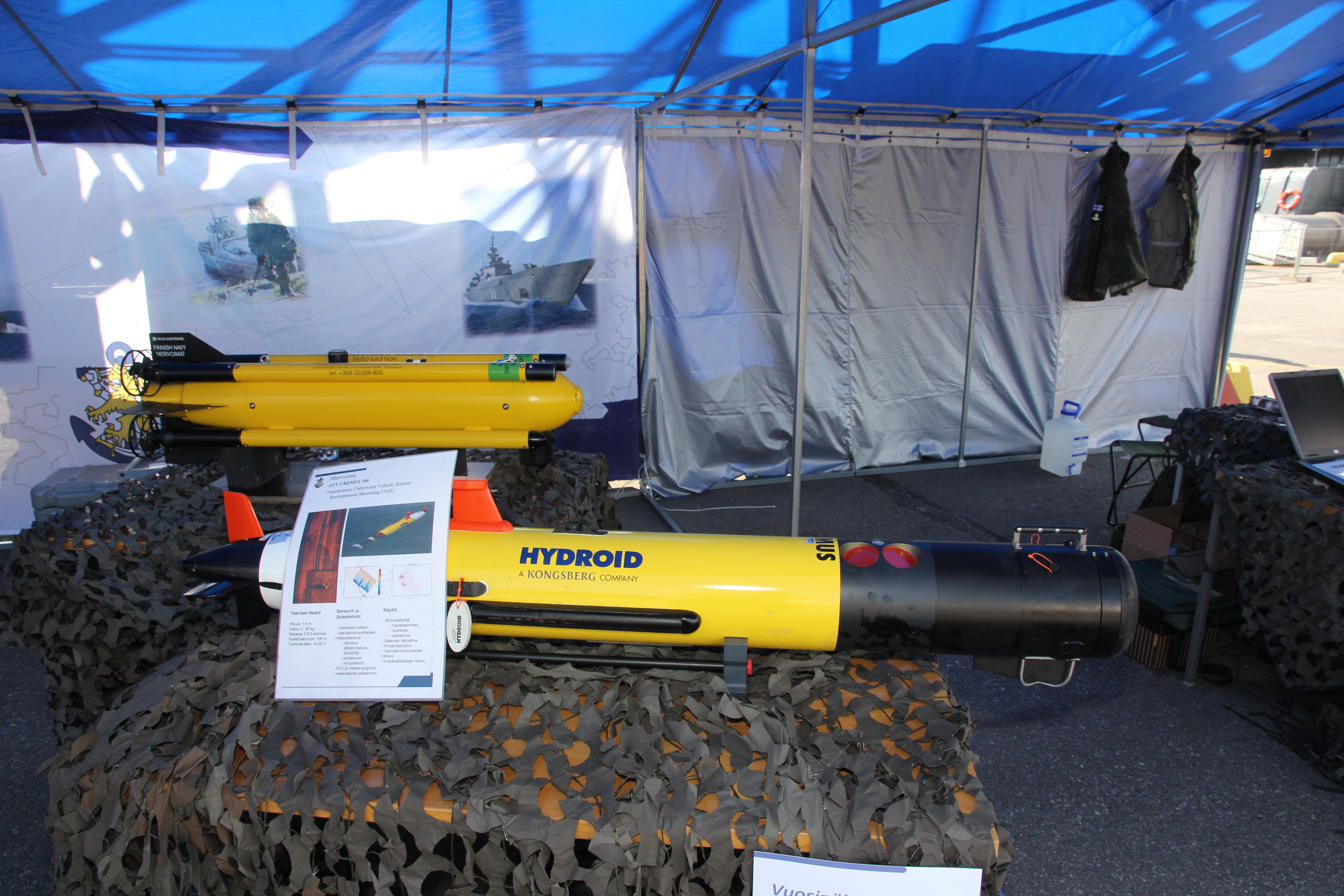
AUV REMUS (front) and Seafox (rear)

=== Military ===
The US Navy began using UUVs in the 1990s to detect and disable underwater mines. UUVs were used by the US Navy during the Iraq War in the 2010s to remove mines around Umm Qasr, a port in southern Iraq.

The Chinese military uses UUVs for mostly data collection and reconnaissance purposes. In May 14, 2025 the NavalNews website published a candid photograph of a likely extra-large uncrewed underwater vehicle being transported under wraps with the speculation that it was the armed UUV-300 design which can host torpedoes, missiles, and mines. The British Royal Navy's Project Cetus vehicle and the Canadian's Cellula Robotics Solus-XR are of similar size.

On December 20, 2020, a fisherman in Indonesia spotted a glider-shaped UUV near Selayar Island in South Sulawesi. Individuals from the Indonesian military have categorized the vehicle to be a Chinese Sea Wing (Haiyi), created for the purposes of collecting data including water temperature, salinity, turbidity, and oxygen levels that can help chart optimal submarine routes.

The navies of multiple countries are developing sophisticated Large unmanned undersea vehicle also known as LUUV or XLUUV, the definition of a LUUV usually involves it being greater then 10 m (32 ft 10 in) in length. Notabul XLUUV's include the US Navy's Orca (AUV) at 85 feet (26 m) development starting in 2017. The United Kingdom has developed Project Cetus a XLUUV at 12 m and with up to 25 tonnes Displacement. There is a further joint venture between US and Australian Navy called Ghost Shark (submarine) this XLUUV also at 12 m with a displacment of 10 tones.

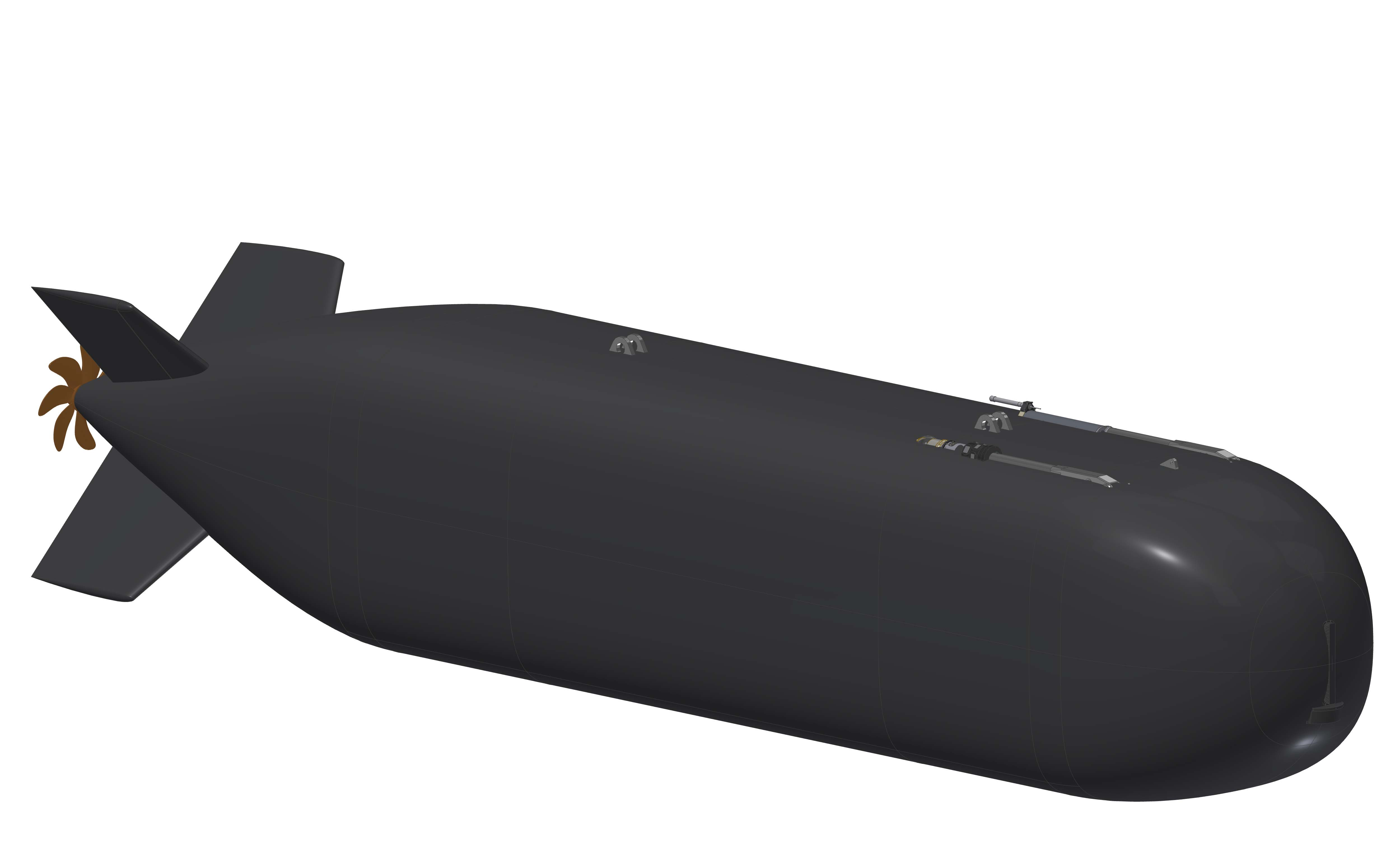
Project Cetus the UK XLUUV

Governments including the US, UK, France, India, Russia, and China are currently creating uncrewed vehicles to be used in oceanic warfare to discover and terminate underwater mines. For instance, the REMUS is a three-foot long robot used to clear mines in one square mile within 16 hours. This is much more efficient, as a team of human divers would need upwards of 21 days to perform the same task.

A survey conducted by RAND Corporation for the US military analyzed the missions which uncrewed underwater vehicles could perform, which included intelligence, reconnaissance, mine countermeasures, and submarine warfare. The review listed these from most to least important.

In November 2022, the Eurasian Times reported that China's Harbin Engineering University has developed trans-medium 'flying submarine' drones capable of both underwater and air travel, noting the potential military applications of the vehicles.

In August 2026, US officials with firsthand knowledge corroborated US President Donald Trump's assertion during the 2026 Iran war that the US Navy had cleared mines from the Strait of Hormuz's Traffic Separation Scheme, Oman's primary maritime corridor with Iran, adding that over the last few months, underwater drones carried out a systematic scanning of the area, identifying over 100 objects suspected of having mines, which were then removed or detonated by private contractors.

==== Status-6 Oceanic Multipurpose System ====
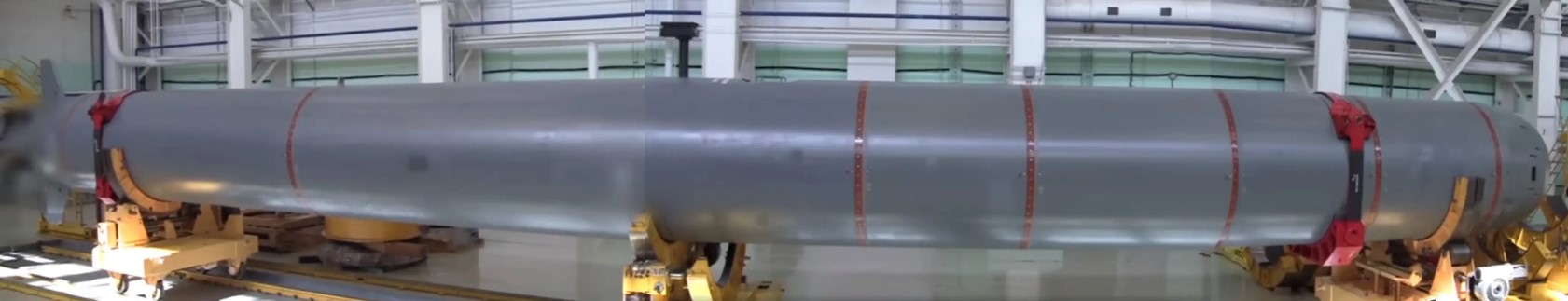
Poseidon UUV with the pump-jet blurred out in back

Status-6 Oceanic Multipurpose System, nicknamed Poseidon, is a nuclear powered UUV developed by Russia that can carry a nuclear warhead. According to Russian state media claims, it can travel at 50 knots and handle depths of over 3,000 feet.

==== Implementations ====
These examples of applications took place during the 2018 Advanced Naval Technology exercises, in August at the Naval Undersea Warfare Center Division Newport. The first example of uncrewed underwater vehicles was displayed by Northrop Grumman with their air drop sonobuoy's from a fire scout aircraft. Throughout the demonstration the company used the: e Iver3-580 (Northrop Grumman AUV) to display their vehicles ability to sweep for mines, while also displaying their real-time target automated recognition system. Another company, Huntington Ingalls Industries, presented their version of an uncrewed underwater vehicle named Proteus. The Proteus is a dual-mode undersea vehicle developed by Huntington and Battelle, the company during the presentation displayed their uncrewed underwater vehicle capabilities by conducting a full-kill demonstration on sea bed warfare. During the demonstration the vehicle utilized a synthetic aperture sonar which was attached to both the port and starboard of the craft, which allowed the uncrewed underwater vehicle to identify the targets placed underwater and to ultimately eliminate them. Ross Lindman (director of operations at the company's technical solution's fleet support group) stated that "The big significance of this is that we ran the full kill chain". "We ran a shortened version of an actual mission. We didn’t say, ‘Well we’re doing this part and you have to imagine this or that.’ We ran the whole thing to illustrate a capability that can be used in the near term." The final demonstration for anned underwater vehicles was displayed by General Dynamics, the company showcased their cross-domain multi-platform UUV through a theater simulating warfare planning tool. Through the utilization of this simulation, they showed a Littoral combat ship along with two uncrewed underwater vehicles. The goal of this exercise was to demonstrate the communication speed between the operator and the UUV. James Langevin, D-R.I., ranking member on the House Armed Services Committee’s subcommittee on emerging threats, stated in regard to this exercise "What this is all driving to is for the warfare commander to be able to make the decisions that are based on what he thinks is high-confidence input quicker than his adversary can," he said. "That’s the goal — we want to be able to … let them make warfare-related decisions quicker than anybody else out there." These exercises were conducted to showcase the applications of uncrewed underwater vehicles within the military community, along with the innovations each company created to better suite these specific mission types.

=== Film uses ===
UUVs were used for the National Geographic documentary "The Dark Secrets of the Lusitania", about the British ocean liner that the Germans sank during World War 1. The camera crew used submarines, ROUVs, and Newtsuits.

Argo, a UUV developed by the Woods Hole Oceanographic Institute (WHOI), helped find the wreckage of the Titanic and film it both at wide and narrow angles. This footage was included in the 1986 National Geographic documentary "Secrets of the Titanic", which details an expedition led by Dr. Robber Ballard.

=== Deep-sea exploration and research ===
A video describing the operation and use of a remotely operated vehicle (ROV) in deep sea research.

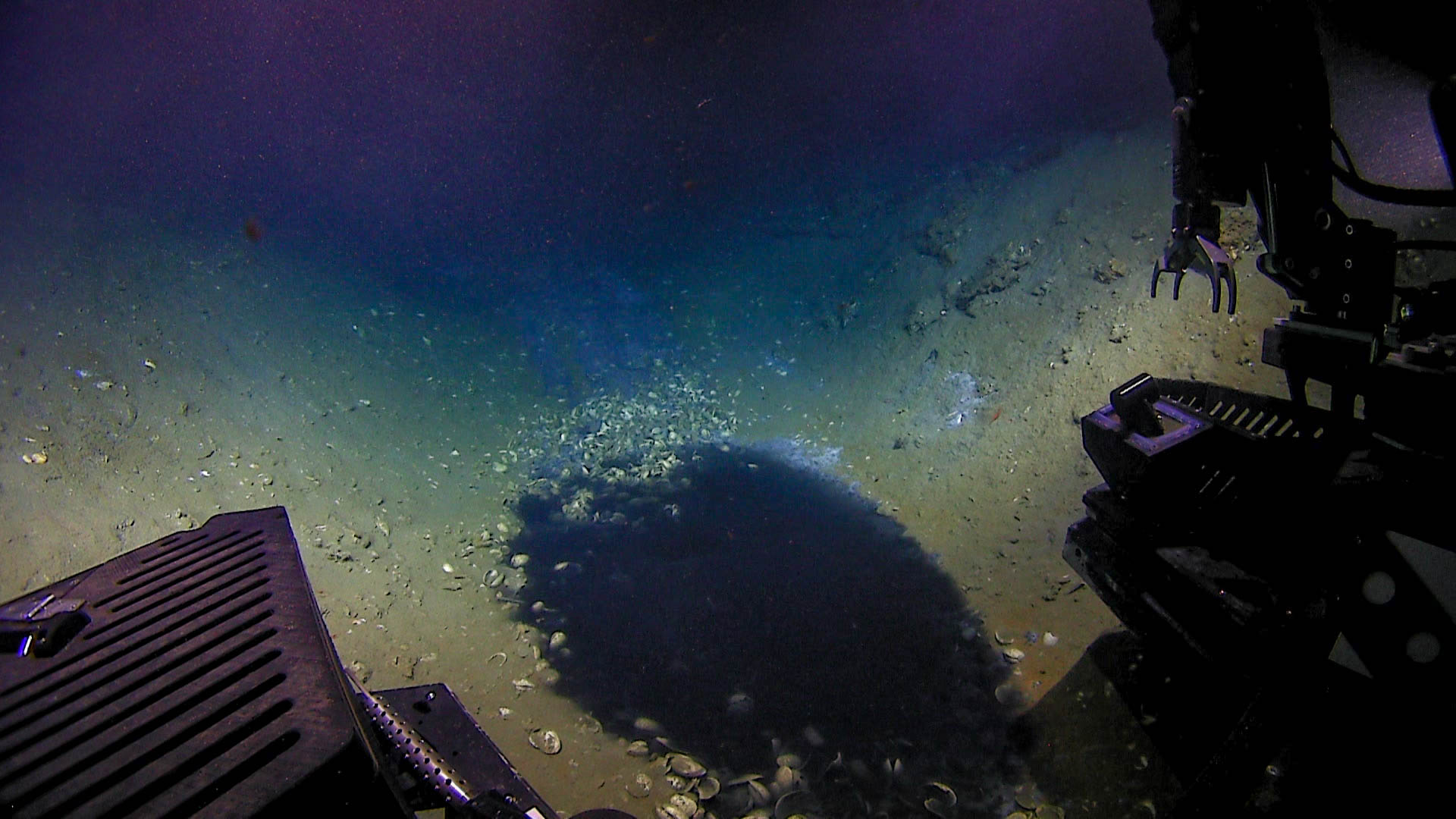
A ROV at 1,067 meters depth.

Uncrewed underwater vehicles can be used for deep-sea exploration and research. For example, remotely operated vehicles have been used to collect samples from the sea-floor to measure its microplastics-contents, to explore the deep-sea fauna and structures and discovering new underwater species.

UUVs are commonly used in oceanic research, for purposes such as current and temperature measurement, ocean floor mapping, and Hydrothermal vent detection. uncrewed underwater vehicles utilize seafloor mapping, bathymetry, digital cameras, magnetic sensors, and ultrasonic imaging.

A video showing the partly autonomous deep-sea soft robots

The Woods Hole Oceanographic Institution employs a vehicle called the Sentry, which is designed to map the ocean floor at depths of six thousand meters. The vehicle is shaped to minimize water resistance during dives, and utilized acoustic communications systems to report the vehicles status while operating. uncrewed underwater vehicles are capable of recording conditions and terrain below sea ice, as the risk of sending an uncrewed vehicle into unstable ice formations is much lower than that of a manned vessel. Glider type uncrewed vehicles are often used to measure ocean temperatures and current strengths at various depths. Their simplicity and reduced operating costs allow more UUVs to be deployed with greater frequency, increasing the accuracy and detail of ocean weather reporting. Many UUVs designed with the purpose of collecting seafloor samples or images are of the towed type, being pulled by a ship's cable along either the seafloor or above. Towed vehicles may be selected for tasks which require large amounts of power and data transmission, such as sample testing and high definition imaging, as their tow cable serve as the method of communication between controller and craft. In 2021, scientists demonstrated a bioinspired self-powered soft robot for deep-sea operation that can withstand the pressure at the deepest part of the ocean at the Mariana Trench. The robot features artificial muscles and wings out of pliable materials and electronics distributed within its silicone body and could be used for exploration and environmental monitoring.

Science Direct claims the use of uncrewed Underwater Vehicles has risen consistently since they were introduced in the 1960s, and find their most frequent use in scientific research and data collection. Oceanservice describes Remote Operated Vehicles (ROVs) and Autonomous underwater vehicle (AUVs) as two variations of UUVs, each able to accomplish the same tasks, provided the craft is properly designed.

=== Ecosystem rehabilitation ===
Companies like Duro AUS offer UUVs that can remotely collect and transmit water data for local governments. Duro helps the New York City government collect data around Randall's Island Park Alliance to monitor water quality and wetland health in the East and Harlem Rivers. Another project that Duro is undertaking is in conjunction with the Bronx River Alliance to help rejuvenate the river's wildlife. Using this data, state and local governments have made key decisions regarding the policies under the New York Ocean Action Plan for adjacent oceans, rivers, and estuaries.

== Concerns ==
A major concern with uncrewed underwater vehicles is communication. Communication between the pilot and uncrewed vehicle is crucial, however there are multiple factors that hinder the connection between the two. One of the major problems involves the distortion of transmissions underwater, because water can distort underwater transmissions and delay them which can be a very major problem in a time sensitive mission. Communications are usually disturbed due to the fact that uncrewed underwater vehicles utilize acoustic waves rather than the more conventional electromagnetic waves. Acoustic wave transmissions are typically delayed between 1–2 seconds, as they move more slowly than other types of waves. Other environmental conditions can also hinder communications such as reflection, refraction, and the absorbing of signal. These underwater phenomena overall scatter and degrade the signal, making UUV communication systems fairly delayed when compared to other communication sources.

A popular navigation system aboard these uncrewed underwater vehicles is acoustic positioning, which is also faced with the same problems as acoustic communication because they use the same system. The Royal Netherlands Navy has published an article detailing their concerns surrounding uncrewed marine vehicles. The Royal Netherlands Navy is strongly concerned with the ability of UUV's to evade detection and complete tasks not possible in manned vessels. The adaptability and utility of uncrewed Underwater vehicles means it will be difficult to predict and counter their future actions. Over the last few years, projects like TWINBOT are developing new ways of communication among several GIRONA500 AUVs.

== See also ==
- Radio-controlled submarine, operated via radio control
- Remotely operated underwater vehicle, operated via cable
