= Variable-buoyancy pressure vessel =

Type of rigid buoyancy control device

A variable-buoyancy pressure vessel system is a type of rigid buoyancy control device for diving systems that retains a constant volume and varies its density by changing the weight (mass) of the contents, either by moving the ambient fluid into and out of a rigid pressure vessel, or by moving a stored liquid between internal and external variable-volume containers. A pressure vessel is used to withstand the hydrostatic pressure of the underwater environment. A variable-buoyancy pressure vessel can have an internal pressure greater or less than ambient pressure, and the pressure difference can vary from positive to negative within the operational depth range, or remain either positive or negative throughout the pressure range, depending on design choices.

Variable buoyancy is a useful characteristic of any mobile underwater system that operates in mid-water without external support. Examples include submarines, submersibles, benthic landers, remotely operated and autonomous underwater vehicles, and underwater divers.

Several applications only need one cycle from positive to negative and back to get down to depth and return to the surface between deployments; others may need tens to hundreds of cycles over several months during a single deployment, or continual but very small adjustments in both directions to maintain a constant depth or neutral buoyancy at changing depths. Several mechanisms are available for this function; some are suitable for multiple cycles between positive and negative buoyancy, and others must be replenished between uses. Their suitability depends on the required characteristics for the specific application.

== Uses of variable buoyancy in diving systems ==
Mobile underwater systems that operate in mid-water without external support need variable buoyancy, and as such these systems are a major research topic in the field of underwater vehicles. Examples include submarines, submersibles, benthic landers, remotely operated and autonomous underwater vehicles, and ambient-pressure and single-atmosphere underwater divers.

A submarine can closely approach equilibrium when submerged but have no inherent stability in depth. The sealed pressure hull structure is usually slightly more compressible than water and will consequently lose buoyancy with increased depth. For precise and quick control of buoyancy and trim at depth, submarines use depth control tanks (DCT)—also called hard tanks (due to their ability to withstand higher pressure) or trim tanks. These are variable-buoyancy pressure vessels. The amount of water in depth control tanks can be controlled to change the buoyancy of the vessel so that it moves up or down in the water column, or to maintain a constant depth as outside conditions (mainly water density) change, and water can be pumped between trim tanks to control longitudinal or transverse trim without affecting buoyancy.

The operating depth of underwater vehicles can be controlled by controlling the buoyancy—by changing either the overall weight or the displaced volume—or by vectored thrust. Buoyancy can be controlled by changing the overall weight of the vehicle at constant volume, or by changing the displaced volume at a constant vehicle weight. The resulting buoyancy is used to control heave velocity and hovering depth, and in underwater gliders a positive or negative net buoyancy is used to drive forward motion.

The Avelo scuba system uses a variable-buoyancy pressure vessel, which is both the primary breathing gas cylinder and the scuba buoyancy compensator, with a rechargeable-battery–powered pump and dump valve unit which is demountable from the cylinder.

Variable-buoyancy systems have been considered for depth control of tethered ocean current turbine electrical generation.

The type of variable-buoyancy system best suited to an application depends on the precision of control required, the amount of change needed, and the number of cycles of buoyancy change necessary during a deployment.

== Types of variable-buoyancy systems ==
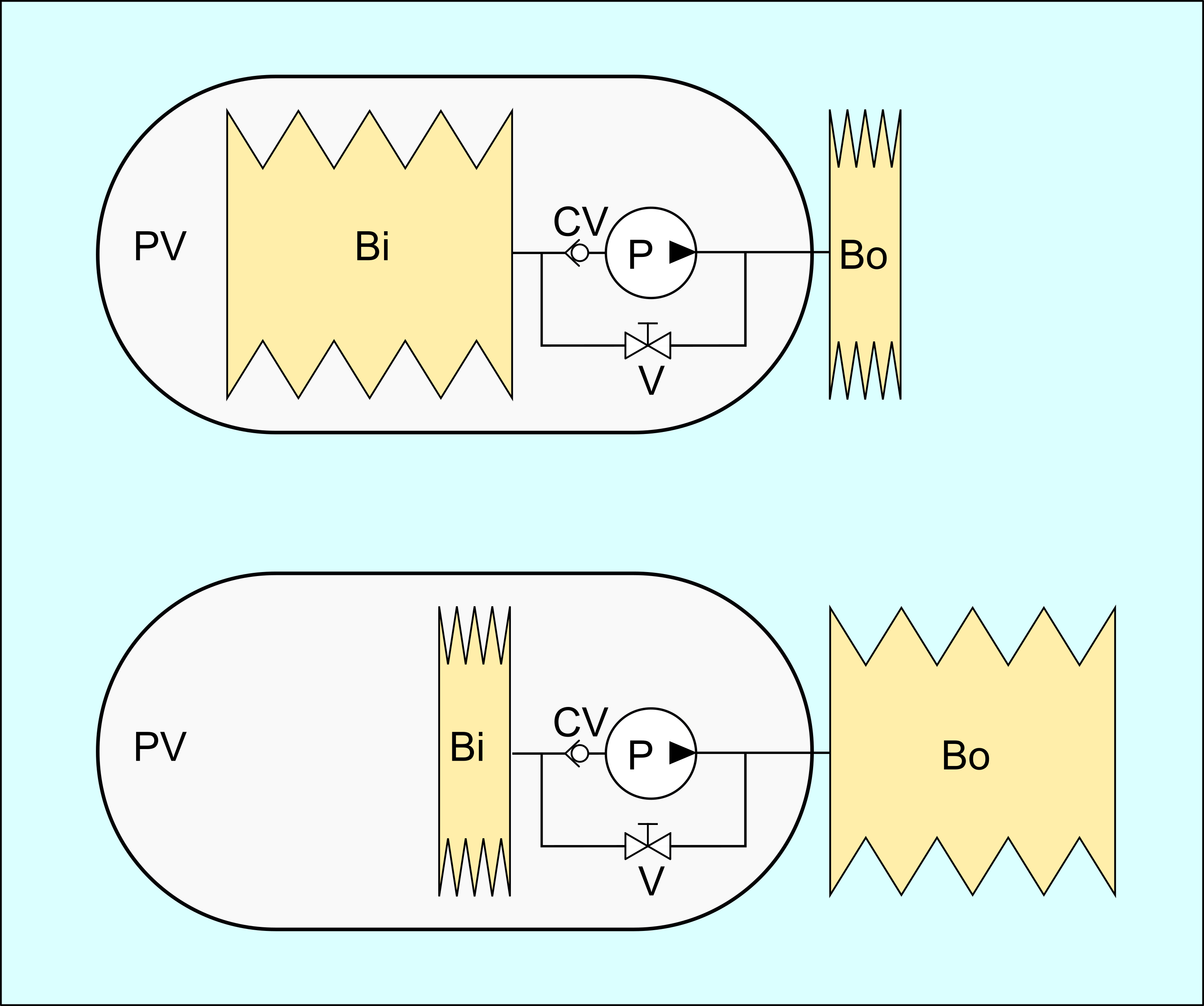
Pumped-oil constant-mass, variable-volume system Top: Low-volume, low-buoyancy state Bottom: High-volume, high-buoyancy state PV = Pressure vessel Bi = Internal bellows Bo = External bellows P = Pump CV = Check valve V = Valve

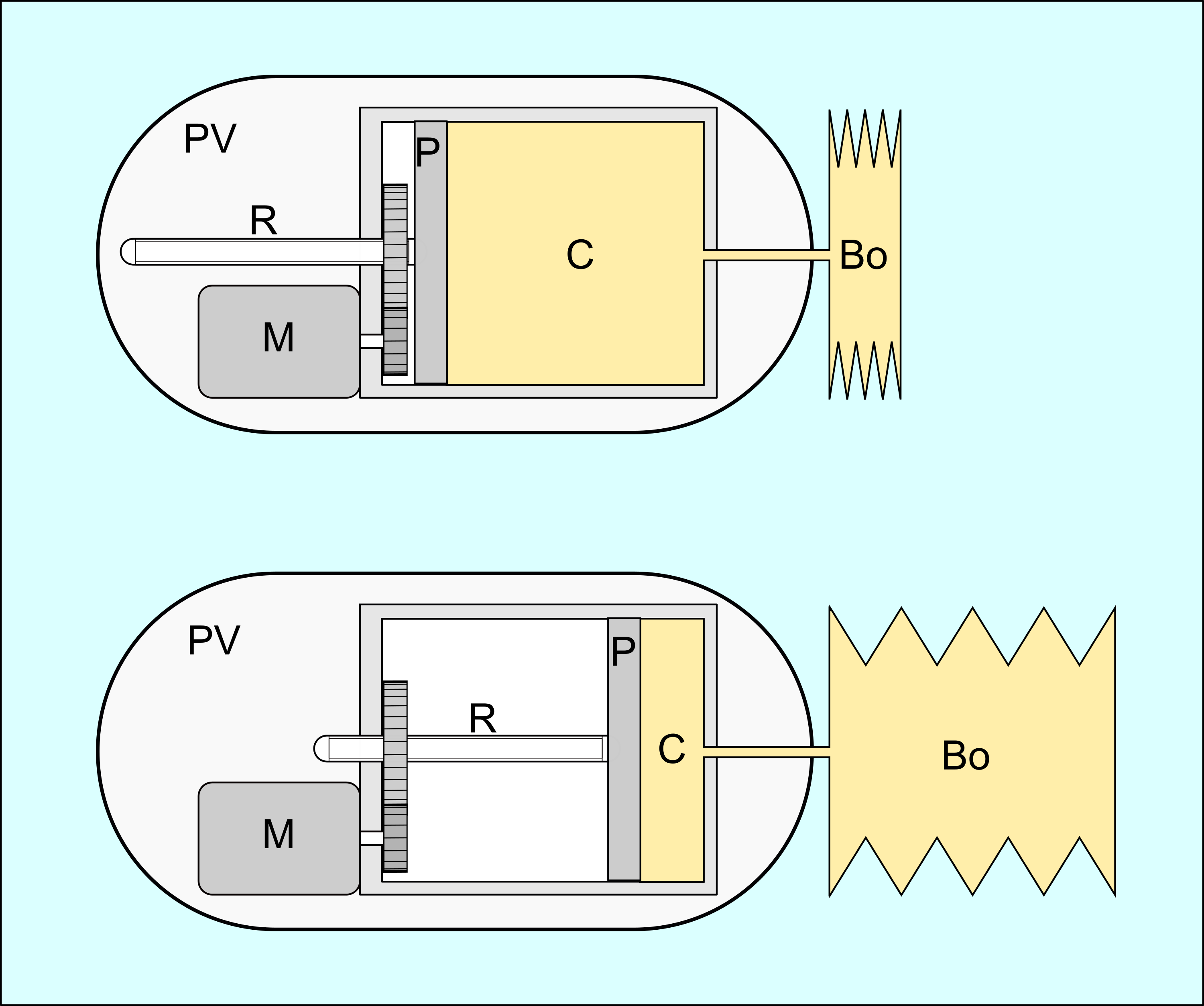
Piston-operated oil-filled constant-mass, variable-volume system Top: Low-volume, low-buoyancy state Bottom: High-volume, high-buoyancy state PV = Pressure vessel Bo = External bellows P = Piston C = Cylinder R = Piston rod M = Motor

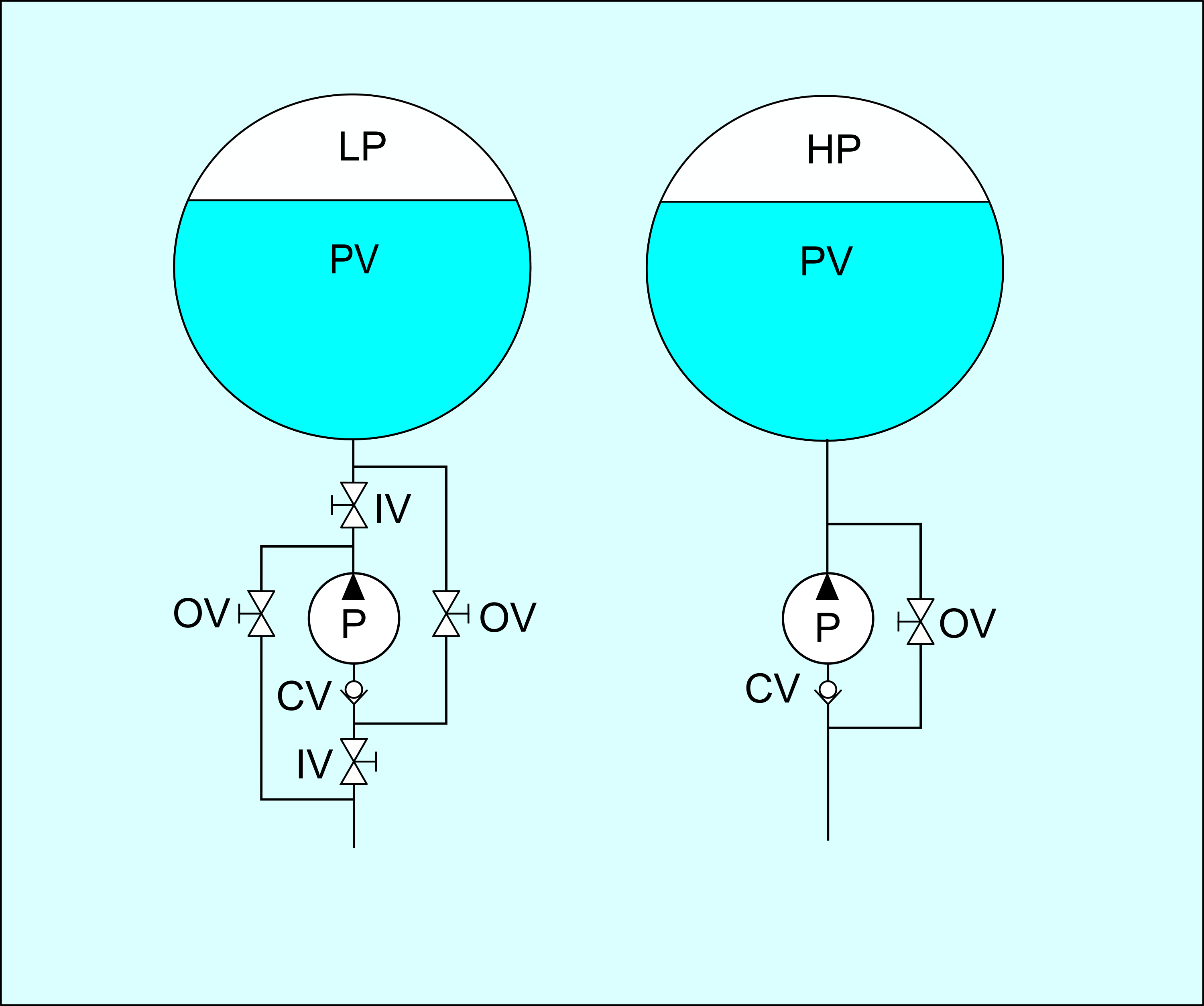
Pumped-water constant-volume, variable-mass system Left: Low internal pressure, pumped both ways Right: High internal pressure, ballast ejected by internal gas pressure PV = Pressure vessel LP = Low internal pressure HP = High internal pressure P = Pump CV = Check valve IV = Inlet valve OV = Outlet valve

Several types of variable-buoyancy systems have been used, and are briefly described here. Some are based on a relatively incompressible pressure vessel and are nearly stable with variation of hydrostatic pressure.

- Ambient-pressure buoyancy/ballast tanks (unstable with depth change), such as the main ballast tanks on a submarine, or an inflatable diver's buoyancy compensator. These are not pressure vessels, as the contents are at ambient pressure.
- Weight-discharge variable-mass system. This is generally a system by which ballast of higher density than the surroundings is discharged, and once discharged the ballast is lost. The system is simple and appropriate for vehicles that only need to make a very limited number of buoyancy adjustments during a deployment. It is a common method of achieving positive buoyancy in an emergency as it is simple to arrange a fail-safe discharge mechanism. An analogous system for releasing fixed low-density material is also possible. These are also not pressure vessels as the weights or incompressible buoys are stored at ambient pressure.
- One-way tank-flood variable-mass system. This is simply an empty tank that can withstand external working pressure and can be partly or completely flooded by a control valve. The tank can be drained again at the surface for subsequent dives, but not while under pressure during a dive.
- Pumped-oil constant-mass, variable-volume system. This method uses more power but is indefinitely repeatable while power lasts, as it does not discharge any consumables. A positive-displacement pump transfers oil stored in a variable-volume container inside a gas-filled pressure vessel to an external variable-volume container, incompressibly increasing the displaced volume of the vehicle. Return transfer may be by pressure difference controlled by a valve, or also pumped.
  - Piston-driven oil-filled constant-mass, variable-volume system. This works very similarly to the pumped oil system, but the internal storage is in a cylinder with a piston which decreases or increases its volume using a mechanical drive, typically powered by an electric motor. In effect the piston acts as a pump.
- Pumped-water variable-buoyancy system. Ambient water is moved into and out of the pressure vessel to change the overall density of the vessel, and thereby of the vehicle of which it is a component. In one direction this transfer may be possible by pressure difference, but in at least one direction it must be pumped. The process is repeatable while power lasts, as the ballast is drawn from the surroundings.

=== Mechanism ===
A buoyancy tank that is within the pressure hull of the vehicle, as in a submarine, will be exposed to the internal pressure of the vehicle, so external pressure loads on the tank may be relatively low. In this case the ballast water transfer into the tank may not require pumping, though a positive-displacement pump may still be useful to accurately control the volume of water admitted. Discharge of ballast water is against the external pressure, which will depend on depth, and will generally require significant work.

If the buoyancy tank is directly exposed to the ambient hydrostatic pressure, the external load due to depth can be high, but if the internal gas pressure is high enough, the pressure difference will be lower, and the pressure vessel is not subjected to high net external pressure loads which can cause buckling instability, which can allow a lower structural weight. In the extreme case the internal pressure is high enough to rapidly eject the water ballast at maximum operational depth, as in the case of the Avelo integrated diving cylinder and buoyancy control device. A pump is used to move ambient water into the pressure vessel against the internal pressure, compressing the gas further in proportion to volume decrease, so the entire internal volume is not available to hold ballast, as although the gas will decrease in volume, there will always be some gas volume remaining. The water and air in the pressure vessel may be separated by a membrane or free piston to prevent pumping out air in some orientations, and to prevent the air from dissolving in the ballast water under high pressure.

== See also ==
- Autonomous underwater vehicle – Uncrewed underwater vehicle with autonomous guidance system
- Ballast tank – Compartment for holding liquid ballast
- Benthic lander – Platform for measurements on the seabed
- Buoyancy compensator (diving) – Equipment for controlling the buoyancy of a diver
- Buoyancy engine – Device that alters a body's buoyancy to provide propulsion
- Submersible – Small watercraft able to navigate under water
- Remotely operated underwater vehicle – A tethered underwater mobile device operated by a remote crew
- Underwater glider – Type of autonomous underwater vehicle
- Variable-buoyancy propulsion – Use of a buoyancy engine to provide propulsion
