= Indian Underwater Robotics Society =

IURS
- Founded: March 2007
- Founder: Anuj Sehgal; Jason Kadarusman
- Type: Research & Education; Non-profit Organisation
- Purpose: Robotics, intelligent systems, and marine technology
- Location: Noida, India
- Origins: Formal registration and mission expansion of the Indian Underwater Robotics Society team at the AUVSI's AUV Competition
- Region served: India
- Method: Research, Educational Workshops, Summer Schools, Publications
- Key people: Anuj Sehgal, President; Shekhar Mehta, COO
- Website: www.iurs.org

The Indian Underwater Robotics Society, or IURS (registered as the Intelligent Unmanned Robotics Society), is India's first and only non-profit research organisation NGO for the advancement of low-cost robotics and intelligent systems research in developing countries. IURS also imparts education in it is focus areas to improve understanding of and representation in intelligent systems research within developing countries.

IURS designed India's first operational Autonomous Underwater Vehicle (AUV) to compete at the AUVSI's International Autonomous Underwater Vehicle Competition. IURS is also the first and only Indian research and education NGO to operate in the field of robotics and intelligent systems.

Ever since its inception in 2004, IURS has made many contributions towards furthering robotics education and research in India through involvement with the government, universities and local and international organisations.

== History ==
Even though IURS officially received its registration under the Societies Registration Act of 1860 only in 2007, the organisation had been functioning in its nascent form ever since December 2004. Initially, the organisation was established with the vision to develop India's first AUV and also enable the first Indian team to compete in the 2005 International Autonomous Underwater Vehicle competition organised by the AUVSI and the US Navy's Office of Naval Research in San Diego, CA, USA.

The student team was put together after a nationwide call for applications and included members who had previously designed AUVs costing under $600 for the international competition. This student team designed the first operational Indian AUV with just a budget of $1000 and lived at relatives' homes in San Diego, the competition location, to save more money. This budget was a minor fraction of what the other teams had available. A new team of individuals competed as the IURS team in 2006 with a slightly higher budget of $1500 and had by this time managed to improve the performance of their AUV. Realizing the dire lack of talent due to a lack of focused and up-to-date education and the unavailability of low-cost robotics parts, the IURS team worked to register itself as an NGO specialising in research and education in the field of robotics.

IURS designed education programmes, including summer schools and workshops, to facilitate practical applications of skills learned in and out of the classroom while producing an environment conducive to the growth of personal, educational, resourceful, and creative skills of students. The first multi-day Introduction to Robotics summer school was organised by using the in-house talents of IURS researchers in New Delhi in June 2007 and saw almost 100 participants from all across India. Better evolutions of this summer school were also conducted in the following years by using faculty and researchers from universities across the globe to bring world-class research experiences within the grasp of attendees.

The organisation became one of the first to launch an online robotics parts store for students. This robotics store was able to bring much-needed easy access to affordable sensors, actuators, and development boards to students by passing on the import duty, tax, and profit savings to students. The emergence of the online robotics store, along with the education programme, launched a price-war amongst the few robotics parts retailers in India, which greatly benefited hobbyists and students.

Workshops and educational programmes conducted by IURS are done with over 200 student and professional members in the organisation. IURS also developed novel low-cost sonar, computer vision and underwater robotic systems as a part of its research.

An international tutorial programme to spread information regarding IURS research programmes was set up in 2009. This tutorial programme is also being used as a method to garner global support for spreading intelligent systems education in developing nations.

Since its official formation in 2007, IURS has been working closely with Indian government organisations such as the Department of Science & Technology (DST) and other NGOs like the Associated Chambers of Commerce and Industry of India (ASSOCHAM) to bring together concerned research institutions, firms, and individuals at one platform for futuristic discussions to create greater awareness and linkages between the potential manufacturers and users of automation and robotics products. IURS has been working closely with policymakers and lawmakers to introduce regulations in the robotics education field in India to ensure that students receive a minimum guaranteed level of up-to-date knowledge rather than being cheated by many organisations looking to quickly profit from students' eagerness to learn. A similar effort to introducing standards within robotics is being pursued to enable low-cost applications to emerge.

Since its foundation, the primary focus of research conducted by IURS scientists has been underwater robotics. However, in recent times, the organisation has started foraying into underwater acoustics, general marine technology and also terrestrial robotics and computer vision systems. IURS is now in the process of setting up national research programmes for students to participate in and gain valuable research experience. The funding for such programmes is to be derived from third-party projects.

== Membership ==
IURS offers two levels of membership, i.e. Student or Professional Membership and research and development Development Team Membership. Though the Student or Professional Memberships are open to anyone by subscription, the Research & Development Team Membership is strictly governed by application or nominations proceeded by governing board voting.

=== Student & Professional Membership ===
This membership programme, which is open to all through subscription, has thus been designed to provide members with the ability to gain access to technical information, tutorials, networking opportunities, low-priced kits, workshops, career development opportunities and other benefits. Through various modes of education, online and offline, IURS membership provides its members the opportunity to learn about the field of robotics and intelligent systems and further their technical skills, which are usable in a wide variety of technology related professions.

To become a Student or Professional member, an individual must only pay the yearly subscription fee to IURS, which is determined by a person's academic status. Currently, IURS has amassed more than 200 such members. Membership to IURS is not restricted by nationality, residence, race or creed, and as such, anyone from across the globe can join this programme.

=== Research & Development Team Membership ===
Unlike the Student & Professional Membership programme, the Research & Development programme is highly selective since it provides access to research facilities and projects that IURS carries out. An individual must be a regular IURS member to be promoted to membership grade, however, this elevation is only achieved through nominations (self-nominations are acceptable).

The nominated individual has to fill up a lengthy form with questions regarding their research interests, background and experience. They must also write motivational statements regarding their interests in participating within IURS research activities. The IURS governing board may approve a member's elevation if their scientific experience is commensurate with the research activities of IURS. Only the following handful individuals have been elevated to the Research & Development Team Member level in the past:

- Yash Agarwal
- Daniel Cernea
- Jason Kadarusman
- Anuj Sehgal
- Parth Shah
- Puneet Singh
- Iyad Tumar

Members at this grade accept scientific positions within the organisation and must contribute towards the research projects of IURS. They must also participate in the educational activities of the organisation, assisting with teaching, organisation and advertising of the events. This position is completely voluntary and does not come with any monetary advantages for the members.

== Education ==
IURS offers multiple types of educational courses to students with faculty from its research team and global educational institutions. Practical learning is the emphasis of all educational programs, and as such, all attendees receive a take-home an electronics kit focused on robotics and built around their own development board.

== See also ==
- Indigenous Indian armed drones for air warfare and surveillance
- Indian AUVs for underwater warfare and surveillance
  - AUV-150
  - Maya AUV India
- Indian Extra-Large unmanned undersea vehicle (ELUUV) for underwater warfare and surveillance
  - Indian ELUUV
