= Uncrewed vehicle =

Type of vehicle

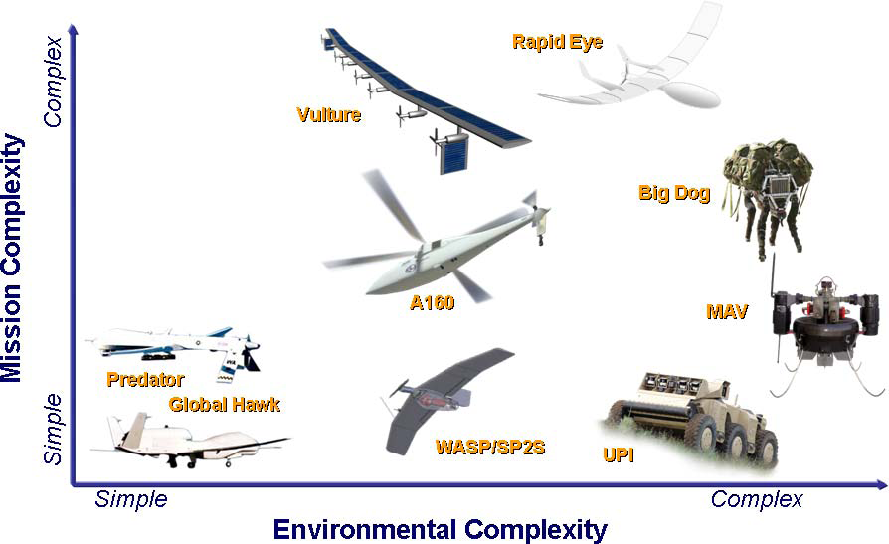
Various uncrewed vehicles

An uncrewed vehicle or unmanned vehicle is a vehicle without a person, including a passenger, on board. Uncrewed vehicles can either be under telerobotic control—remote controlled or remote guided vehicles—or they can be autonomously controlled—autonomous vehicles—which are capable of sensing their environment and navigating on their own.

It has been reported that the armed forces of more than 100 countries have approximately 170 different types of drones in service.

== Types ==
There are different types of uncrewed vehicles:

- Remote control vehicle (RC), such as radio-controlled cars or radio-controlled aircraft
- Unmanned ground vehicle (UGV), such as the autonomous cars, or unmanned combat vehicles (UCGV)
  - Self-driving truck
  - Driverless tractor
- Unmanned ground and aerial vehicle (UGAV), unmanned vehicle with hybrid locomotion methods
- Unmanned aerial vehicle (UAV), unmanned aircraft, either fixed-wing or rotorwing, commonly known as "drone"
  - Unmanned combat aerial vehicle (UCAV)
  - Medium-altitude long-endurance unmanned aerial vehicle (MALE)
  - Miniature UAV (SUAV)
  - Delivery drone
  - Micro air vehicle (MAV)
  - Target drone
- Autonomous spaceport drone ship
- Unmanned surface vehicle (USV), also known as "surface drone" or "drone ship", for operations on the surface of the water
- Unmanned underwater vehicle (UUV), also known as "underwater drone" or "drone sub", for operations underwater
  - Remotely operated underwater vehicle (ROUV)
  - Autonomous underwater vehicle (AUV)
    - Intervention AUV (IAUV)
    - Underwater glider
- Uncrewed spacecraft, both remote controlled ("uncrewed space mission") and autonomous ("robotic spacecraft" or "space probe")

== See also ==
- Vehicular automation
- Optionally piloted vehicle
- Automatic train operation (ATO), such as the "Driverless Train"
- Robot
- Robot control
