= XTDT unmanned vehicles =

Chinese unmanned vehicles

XTDT unmanned vehicles are uncrewed vehicles developed in the People's Republic of China (PRC) by Xi'an Tianhe Defense Technology Co. Ltd. (XTDT, 西安天和海防智能科技), most of which are in service with various Chinese governmental agencies/departments, and government-owned enterprises, as well as Chinese military.

== China Shadowless AUVs ==
China Shadowless (Zhong-Guo-Wu-Ying, 中国无影) autonomous underwater vehicle (AUV) is a family of very little known unmanned underwater vehicle (UUV) jointly developed in the People's Republic of China (PRC) by Northwestern Polytechnical University (NPU) and XTDT.

China Shadowless AUV is developed under the Deep sea Submersible Technology and Equipment project of the 863 Program, and started in 2010, with NPU assigned as the general designer. After more than half a decade, development was completed, and the series production was handled by XTDT for better efficiency. All models of China Shadowless AUV adopts a torpedo-shaped hull, and various in sizes, and are intended for various missions such as underwater inspection, observation, surveying, and military applications such as minesweeping. As of early 2020s, a total of four models have been identified, some has their own derivatives based on their application:

- TH-B010: a micro AUV
- TH-B050: a transportable AUV weighing 50 kg.
- TH-B300: a mini AUV
- TH-B600: a mid-sized AUV

A derivative of TH-B010 designated as TH-B010E is used by the People's Liberation Army Navy (PLAN) both as a disposable anti-submarine training drone, and an underwater decoy launched by submarines for distract incoming torpedoes. TH-B050 also have a derivative designated as TH-B050R.

== Hull cleaning robot ==
Hull cleaning robot is an unmanned vehicle developed by XTDT, and it is designed to replace divers to clean the hulls of ships, such as rid of salt, rust, and marine animals attached to the hulls of the ships. In addition to replace manual cleaning, Hull Cleaning Robot is also designed to perform other manual tasks such as painting, inspection, and sanding.
