= Autonomous Robotics =

UK company developing an autonomous underwater vehicle

Autonomous Robotics Ltd
- Industry: Marine technology
- Founded: 2002
- Headquarters: Bishopstrow, Warminster, England
- Parent: Thalassa Holdings Ltd
- Website: autonomousroboticsltd.com

Autonomous Robotics Ltd, previously GO Science Ltd, is a British company founded in 2002 to develop an autonomous underwater vehicle (AUV) with ocean-bottom seismometer (OBS) sensors. Since 2014 the company has been a subsidiary of Thalassa Holdings Ltd.

== History ==
GO Science Ltd was founded in 2002 in Bristol, UK by a former BAe director of Underwater Systems, and a founder of the Las Iguanas restaurant chain, to develop a "ring wing" autonomous underwater vehicle (AUV). Initial funding was from the South West Regional Development Agency (SWRDA) in 2006. In November 2008 ICON Corporate Finance raised significant investment (19.4%) for GO Science from Kenda Capital, the manager of the Shell Technology Ventures Fund 1 (STVF) with Kenda directors joining the board. The prototype vehicle was developed in the University of Bristol labs, then at Redhill Farm Business Park and later at Aztec West, outside Bristol. An office was opened at the SETsquared Business Acceleration Centre at the University of Bristol.

In September 2009 the company announced that it had won a £6m contract with an unnamed oil company. This was later confirmed as Shell E&P, adding the challenge of a deepwater specification. Shell's Chief Scientist Geophysics stated that the concept was to be tested "in earnest" for a few months whilst recognising the cost and acknowledging that "we're happy to partner with others". Shell provided the company with over £4 million of investment. Subsequently, GO Science announced it was under contract to "two very large companies". In May 2012 the planned trials for Shell E&P consisted of a five vehicle trial in the Gulf of Mexico, USA, for the summer of 2012, with a larger trial of fifty vehicles in 2013. Neither of these trials were undertaken.

Pressures on the company increased through 2012–13. STVF were looking critically at their investments, following a review of the portfolio companies by a senior Schlumberger executive in 2011. The GO Science accounts to the end of 2012 showed a loss of £0.3m. In June 2013 the company applied for funding from the West of England Going for Growth campaign. At the same time the company's commitments to Shell E&P, with regard to the planned trials, were slipping.

On 31 July 2013 GO Science Ltd was placed into administration at the request of STVF, due £2.5m with other creditors owed over £0.5m. Six of the thirteen staff were made redundant. However, ten potential buyers approached the administrators, BDO, and in September 2013 Thalassa Holdings Ltd agreed to pay £3.6m for the company. At the close of 2013 the GO Science shareholders expected to receive Thalassa shares if "Go Science's principal customer contracts are re-activated." Thalassa, which possesses expertise in OBS, has made the acquisition "on what appear to be extremely favourable terms" according to AimZine. In 2014 it was revealed that Thalassa had paid rather less for GO Science, $2.9m, and registered the group in the British Virgin Islands. Thalassa appointed a previous managing director of Saab Seaeye Ltd as CEO, the company was renamed Autonomous Robotics Ltd and relocated to Warminster, UK.

In 2019, the company had seven employees.

== Ocean Bottom Seismic ==
The initial markets investigated included military, environmental and exploration applications. In June 2008 the company committed to developing an application for seabed seismic sensors (Ocean Bottom Seismic, OBS) for oil and gas exploration. A "swarm" of autonomous vehicles, as a self-deploying and -recovering sensor grid, offers potential efficiency savings over cables or populating a grid with sensors one-at-a-time by a remotely operated underwater vehicle (ROV). The ambition at this time was for the first production vehicles to be operational by 2010. Thalassa have described this technology as having the "potential to have a massive impact on the way marine seismic data is collected".

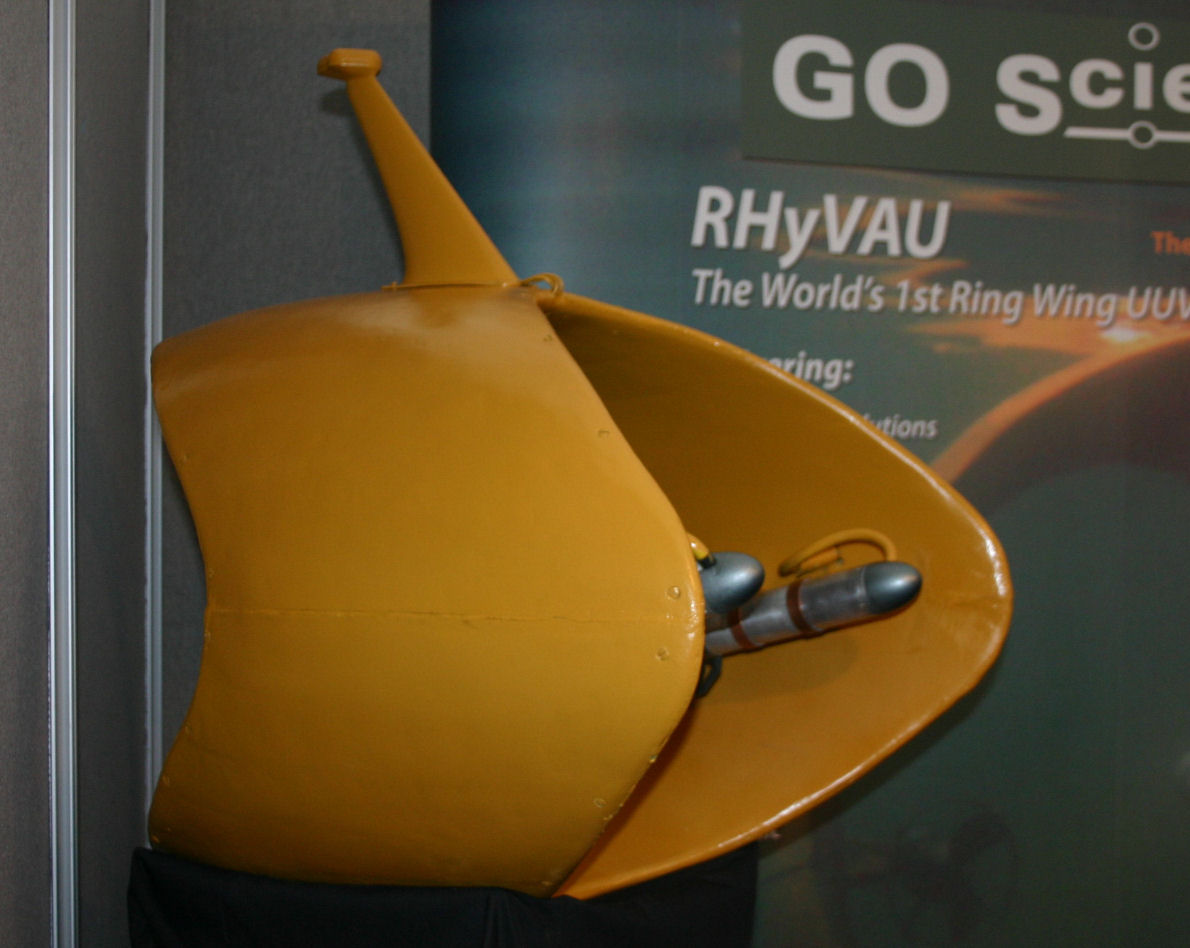
GO Science RHyVAU on display at an exhibition in Southampton, UK

== Autonomous Underwater Vehicle ==
GO Science's RHyVAU (Ring Hydro Vessel Agent Under-liquid) was an autonomous underwater vehicle (AUV), a type of unmanned underwater vehicle (UUV).

The design was that of a "ring wing", a hydrofoil section rotated about the axis to form a toroid. Of fixed chord, the leading edge was also swept aft toward the top and bottom of the toroid. This form can generate lift in descending or ascending glide paths. With twin thrusters mounted inside the duct, the vehicle was very manoeuvrable in comparison to a torpedo type design, for a slight drag penalty. The first of a number of international patents was filed in October 2006.

The prototype vehicle had an outside diameter of 533mm, 21" being a common torpedo size, 25 kg mass and a 1.1 kWh lithium polymer battery supplying two 2 kW thrusters and was capable of 8 knots. Trials were conducted in enclosed waters around the UK and in the Netherlands. The production version was proposed to cost US$30–60,000 each, was designed to operate in depths in excess of 2,000 m and "can organize itself into a "swarm" with up to 2,500 units in a coordinated autonomous group" up to 100 km from the launch point. As well as the powered version (called Contueor), the company considered glider versions (Indago), towed versions (Aspicere), and aerial versions (μRaptor).

ARL Flying Node presented in October 2015

Autonomous Robotics have been working on a more conventionally shaped AUV for the OBS application, and presented a full-scale model of the new vehicle in 2015. ARL predicts a tenfold improvement in the deployment and recovery rates over ROV placement, with the intention to use 3,500 nodes in a system, deploying for up to 60 days in up to 3,000m of water.
