= Alan E. Salzman =

American venture capitalist

Alan Salzman
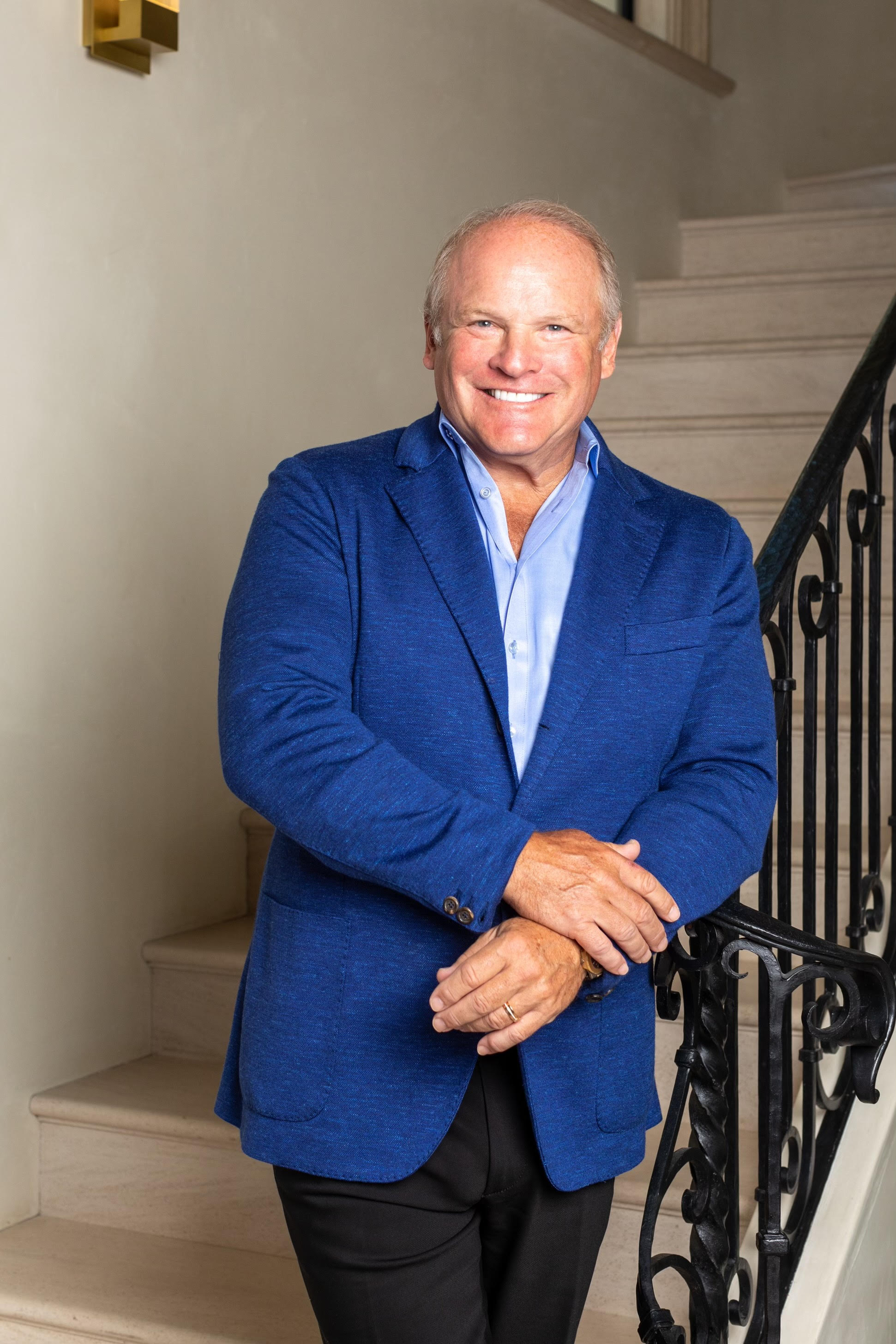
- Born: Alan E. Salzman; 1953 (age 72–73); United States
- Education: London School of Economics; University of Toronto; Stanford Law School; University of Brussels
- Occupations: Venture capitalist and CEO
- Spouse: Tiara Cameron Salzman (m. 2020)

Alan E. Salzman (born 1953) is an American venture capitalist and managing partner. He is the co-founder, CEO and Managing Partner of VantagePoint Capital Partners, a venture capital firm in the U.S. and an investor in clean technology companies.

== Education ==
Salzman is a graduate of the London School of Economics (GC), the University of Toronto (BA), Stanford Law School (JD), and the University of Brussels, Belgium (LLM).

== Career ==
In 1996, Salzman, and Jim Marver, co-founded VantagePoint Capital Partners, a venture capital firm based in San Bruno, California which funded tech startups, including MySpace and Flip, before changing its focus to clean energy. VantagePoint manages approximately $4.5 billion of committed capital, including more than $1 billion committed to clean energy technology. In his career, Salzman has been involved with funding more than 300 startup companies including Tesla Motors, BrightSource Energy, Goldwind, Liquid Robotics and Solarcentury.

Salzman has served as Finance Chair of the World Business Summit on Climate Change, is a member of the BP Alternative Energy’s advisory board and was an adjunct professor at Stanford University. He currently serves as a member of the International Leadership Council of The Climate Group, is a member of the World Economic Forum having served on its technology pioneer selection committee and is on the board of the Silicon Valley Leadership Group.

In 2015, Tesla CEO Elon Musk, had characterized Salzman as a bad faith investor, claiming that Salzman tried to block an early-stage funding round in Tesla, that was vital if the business was to continue to trade. Musk assumed that Salzman wanted to bankrupt Tesla, emerging from the process with control of its assets.

== Personal life ==
Salzman is married to Tiara Cameron Salzman. In November 2020, the couple bought a mansion in Montecito, California. They also built and donated a library and community center, called the Salzman Library, in Namibia in January 2021.
