= Buoyancy engine =

Device that alters a body's buoyancy to provide propulsion

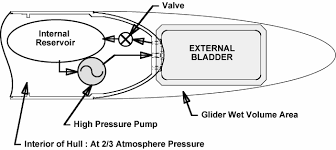
Diagram of how a Buoyancy Engine works

A buoyancy engine is a device that alters the buoyancy of a vehicle or object in order to either move it vertically, as in the case of underwater profiling floats and stealth buoys, or provide forward motion (therefore providing variable-buoyancy propulsion) such as with underwater gliders and some autonomous aircraft.

For underwater applications, buoyancy engines typically involve a hydraulic pump that either inflates and deflates an external bladder filled with hydraulic fluid, or extends and retracts a rigid plunger. The change in the vehicle's total volume alters its buoyancy, making it float upwards or sink as required. Alternative systems employing gas obtained from water electrolysis, rather than hydraulic fluid, have also been proposed, as have systems which pump ambient water into and out of a pressure vessel.

== Operation ==
The buoyancy engine is a technology used in research for underwater surveillance and mapping. A buoyancy engine works by changing the buoyancy of the device to make the vehicle positively or negatively buoyant so that it will float or sink through the water column. One way of doing this is by inflating and deflating an oil bladder outside the rigid pressure hull using oil stored inside the rigid pressure hull. In doing so, this changes the density of the craft the engine is installed on. As a result, an autonomous underwater vehicle such as an underwater glider can repeatedly adjust its buoyancy without external input. This allows the glider to remain in operation, independent of a surface vessel, for a longer duration, which makes the underwater glider a more viable tool for mapping the ocean floor.

An underwater glider works similarly to how an aircraft glider works, in that it utilizes the flow of water over a set of airfoil section wings to generate lift. The direction of the lift generated induces forward motion, whether the vehicle is gliding down when negatively buoyant or up when positively buoyant. The way weight is distributed within the underwater glider helps with this by putting the center of gravity at or just in front of the leading edge of the wings. This promotes an efficient and smooth glide slope. The buoyancy engine allows an underwater glider to continue this gliding process for extended periods by reversing the vertical force inducing the glide when the vehicle reaches the top and bottom depth limits of its operating envelope. Without a buoyancy engine, an underwater glider could be used once and then deploy a package that would float to the surface where it can be retrieved, or drop ballast, with the same effect. With the addition of a buoyancy engine, the underwater glider becomes a more viable tool as it can stay in operation longer and can be reused.

An underwater glider, like an aircraft glider, loses altitude as it moves forward. In the case of an underwater glider, its depth increases. Eventually, any glider will touch the ground. With a gliding aircraft, this is not much of an issue since they are expected to land and are reusable when they do so. This is not true for an underwater glider. If an underwater glider were to land on the ocean floor, it is essentially lost. Since a buoyancy engine allows a glider to change its density, the glider can glide in two directions. It can glide down like an aircraft, or it can glide up if it makes itself less dense than the water around it. In this way, as long as the buoyancy engine remains active, and power is available, an underwater glider can continue to operate.

The actual operation of a buoyancy engine occurs through a complex system of tubing, valves, and sensors. When a glider equipped with a buoyancy engine is deployed, the glider will increase its density to sink to an appropriate depth at which to start its mission. Once at that depth, the glider will begin the mission and the buoyancy engine will adjust the density to a value that is efficient for gliding. When a predetermined depth has been reached, the buoyancy engine will decrease density and this will cause the glider to glide back towards the surface. In this way, the underwater glider remains in operation between two preset depths. The mechanism used to modify buoyancy for this purpose is often a variable buoyancy pressure vessel.

== Application ==
The buoyancy engine, when combined with the underwater glider, gives scientists and other individuals or organizations access to hardware to survey the ocean depths. For instance, the buoyancy engine, since it is used on underwater gliders and extends the capabilities of such craft, would be able to more effectively map the ocean floor. The use of the buoyancy engine has other effects as well. It could be used to improve the detection of underwater stores of oil. In addition, since the operational range of underwater gliders is increased through the use of buoyancy engines, ocean floors can be mapped in larger sections which is more efficient than pre-existing technologies. Also, buoyancy engines do not give off environmentally harmful substances making them an environmentally safe technology.

Other applications that extend from this include investigating disasters that happen at sea. Due to the increased mapping capabilities provided by the buoyancy engine, searching for the wreckage of an airliner or passenger ship can be conducted more economically by a larger number of units, so the wreckage may be found sooner and evidence can be collected more efficiently. Ocean mapping and underwater surveillance are important as they can reveal resources that would not be available otherwise.
