= Liberdade class underwater glider =

Buoyancy-propelled autonomous undersea vehicle

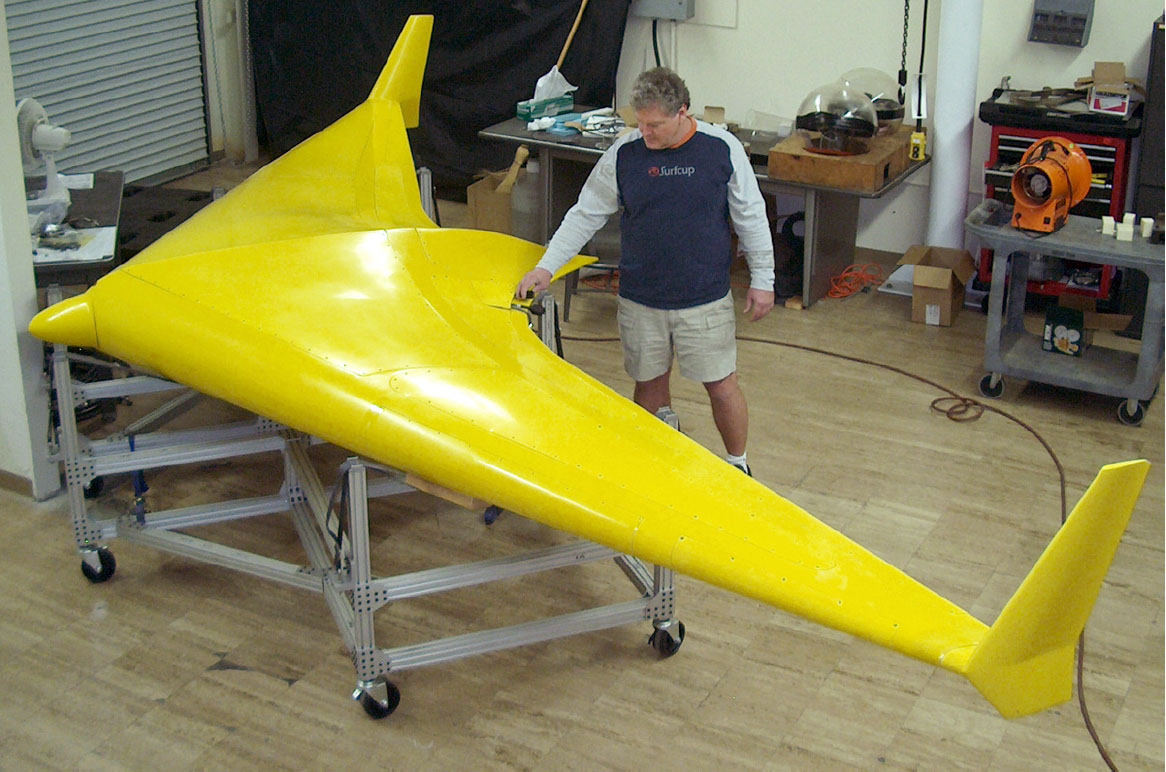
- Liberdade XRay1 glider

Class overview
- Name: Liberdade wing gliders
- Builders: LBI (Connecticut)
- Operators: United States Navy
- Active: ZRay (2010)
- Retired: StingRay (2004), XRay1 (2006), XRay2 (2007)

General characteristics
- Type: Autonomous blended wing body underwater glider
- Beam: 6.1 meters
- Speed: 1–3 knots
- Range: 1200–1500 km (planned)
- Test depth: 300 m
- Complement: Unmanned
- Sensors & processing systems: Hydrophone arrays, vector sensors, and electric field sensors
- Notes: Acoustic and satellite communications capabilities

Liberdade class blended wing bodies are autonomous underwater gliders developed by the US Navy Office of Naval Research which use a blended wing body hullform to achieve hydrodynamic efficiency. It is an experimental class whose models were originally intended to track quiet diesel electric submarines in littoral waters, moving at 1–3 knots and remaining on station for up to six months. Liberdade (Portuguese for "Liberty") was a ship built by Joshua Slocum, prior to the one he single-handedly piloted around the world.

The "Liberdade" class are the world's largest known underwater gliders and were developed as part of the US Navy's Persistent Littoral Undersea Surveillance Network (PlusNet) system of unmanned surveillance vehicles. A "Liberdade" glider can be deployed covertly, with the capability of monitoring over 1,000 km of ocean. The glider is designed to be difficult to detect using passive acoustic sensing.

The Marine Physical Lab at Scripps Institution of Oceanography, and the Applied Physics Lab at the University of Washington were the primary developers of the "Liberdade" class. The hull of the latest model was constructed by Legnos Boat, and consists of an ABS outer shell over a titanium frame. First major field tests of the Liberdade XRay took place in 2006 in Monterey Bay, California. Also participating in the development of the Liberdade class wings were:

- University of Texas at Austin's Applied Research Lab
- Applied Research Lab at Penn State University
- Massachusetts Institute of Technology
- Woods Hole Oceanographic Institution
- SAIC
- Bluefin Robotics

In 2007, XRay 2 was completed and demonstrated a 20 to 1 lift-to-drag ratio. In 2008, 55 field tests were conducted. In 2010, the latest generation "ZRay" model was completed; it includes a 27 channel hydrophone array. Its function is to track and automatically identify marine mammals. ZRay has a 35 to 1 lift-to-drag ratio, and has water jets for fine attitude control, as well as propulsion on the surface.
