= Underwater glider =

Type of autonomous underwater vehicle

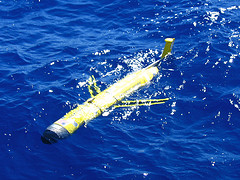
A Rutgers Slocum RU02 underwater glider deployed

An underwater glider is a type of autonomous underwater vehicle (AUV) that employs variable-buoyancy propulsion instead of traditional propellers or thrusters. It employs variable buoyancy in a similar way to a profiling float, but unlike a float, which can move only up and down, an underwater glider is fitted with hydrofoils (underwater wings) that allow it to glide forward while descending through the water. At a certain depth, the glider switches to positive buoyancy to climb back up and forward, and the cycle is then repeated.

While not as fast as conventional AUVs, gliders offer significantly greater range and endurance compared to traditional AUVs, extending ocean sampling missions from hours to weeks or months, and to thousands of kilometers of range. The typical up-and-down, sawtooth-like profile followed by a glider can provide data on temporal and spatial scales unattainable by powered AUVs and much more costly to sample using traditional shipboard techniques. A wide variety of glider designs are in use by navies and ocean research organizations, with gliders typically costing around US$100,000.

== History ==
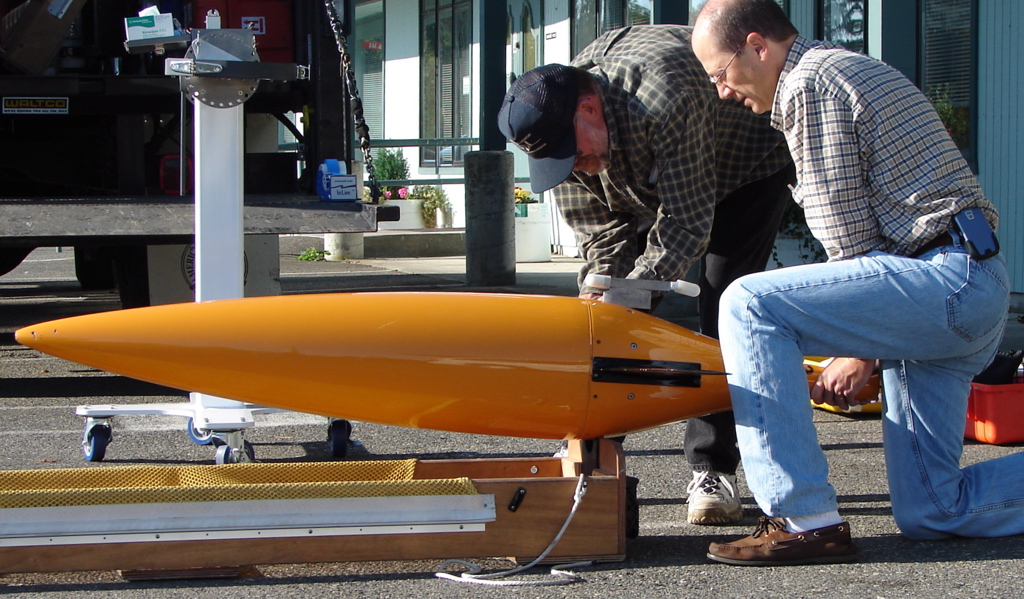
A University of Washington Seaglider being prepared for deployment

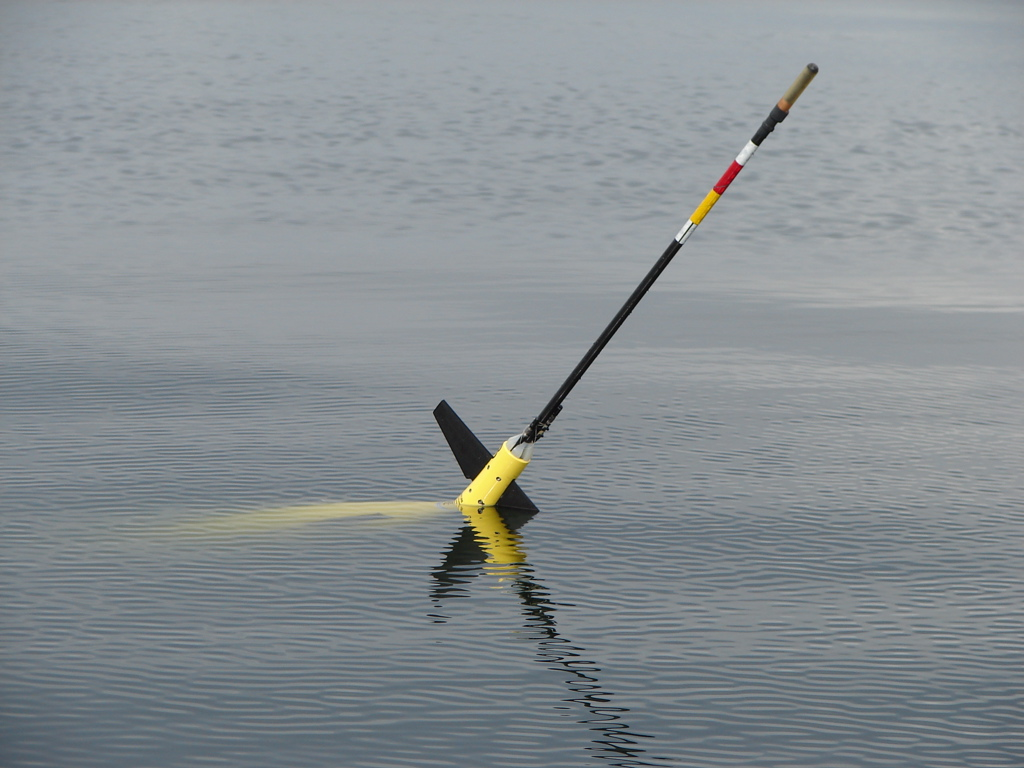
A Seaglider at the surface between dives

The concept of an underwater glider was first explored in the early 1960s with a prototype swimmer delivery vehicle named Concept Whisper. The sawtooth glide pattern, stealth properties and the idea of a buoyancy engine powered by the swimmer-passenger was described by Ewan Fallon in his Hydroglider patent submitted in 1960. In 1992, the University of Tokyo conducted tests on ALBAC, a drop weight glider with no buoyancy control and only one glide cycle. The DARPA SBIR program received a proposal for a temperature gradient glider in 1988. DARPA was aware at that time of similar research projects underway in the USSR. This idea, a glider with a buoyancy engine powered by a heat exchanger, was introduced to the oceanographic community by Henry Stommel in a 1989 article in Oceanography, when he proposed a glider concept called Slocum, developed with research engineer Doug Webb. They named the glider after Joshua Slocum, who made the first solo circumnavigation of the globe by sailboat. They proposed harnessing energy from the thermal gradient of 2 to 4°C (3.6 to 7.2°F) between deep ocean water and surface water (near atmospheric temperature) to achieve globe-circling range, constrained only by battery power on board for communications, sensors, and navigational computers.

By 2003, not only had a working thermal-powered glider (Slocum Thermal) been demonstrated by Webb Research (founded by Doug Webb), but they and other institutions had introduced battery-powered gliders with impressive duration and efficiency, far exceeding that of traditional survey-class AUVs. These vehicles have been widely deployed in the years since then. The University of Washington Seaglider, Scripps Institution of Oceanography Spray, and Teledyne Webb Research Slocum vehicles have performed feats such as completing a transatlantic journey and conducting sustained, multi-vehicle collaborative monitoring of oceanographic variables. In 2011, the first wingless glider, SeaExplorer, was released by a collaboration of French institutions and companies.

In 2020, NOAA was using "hurricane gliders" to monitor the temperature of the water around the Gulf Stream, for the agency to better understand how warm waters affect hurricanes and storms.

== Functional description ==
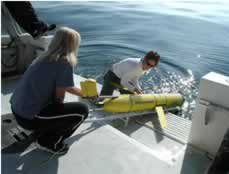
National Oceanic and Atmospheric Administration personnel launch a Slocum glider.

Gliders typically make measurements such as temperature, conductivity (to calculate salinity), currents, chlorophyll fluorescence, optical backscatter, bottom depth, and sometimes acoustic backscatter or ambient sound. They navigate with the help of periodic surface GPS fixes, pressure sensors, tilt sensors, and magnetic compasses. Vehicle pitch is controllable by movable internal ballast (usually battery packs), and steering is accomplished either with a rudder (as in Slocum) or by moving internal ballast to control roll (as in SeaExplorer, Spray and Seaglider). Buoyancy is adjusted either by using a piston to flood/evacuate a compartment with seawater (Slocum) or by moving oil in/out of an external bladder (SeaExplorer, Seaglider, Spray, and Slocum Thermal). Because buoyancy adjustments are relatively small, a glider's ballast must typically be adjusted before the start of a mission to achieve an overall vehicle density close to that of the water it will be deployed in. Commands and data are relayed between gliders and shore by satellite.

Gliders vary in the pressure they are able to withstand. The Slocum model is rated for 200-meter (656 ft) or 1,000-metre (3,281 ft) depths. Spray can operate to 1,500 meters (4,921 ft), Seaglider to 1,000 meters (3,281 ft), SeaExplorer to 700 meters (2,297 ft), and Slocum Thermal to 1,200 meters (3,937 ft). In August 2010, a Deep Glider variant of the Seaglider achieved a repeated 6,000-meter (19,685 ft) operating depth. A Chinese glider reached similar depths in 2016.

== Liberdade class flying wings ==
In 2004, the US Navy Office of Naval Research began developing the world's largest glider, the Liberdade class flying wing glider, which uses a blended wing body hullform to achieve hydrodynamic efficiency. They were initially designed to quietly track diesel electric submarines in littoral waters, remaining on station for up to six months. By 2012, a newer model, known as the ZRay, was designed to track and identify marine mammals for extended periods of time. It uses water jets for fine attitude control as well as propulsion on the surface.

== Payloads ==
Gliders were designed to carry oceanographic instrumentation. Initially simple conductivity, temperature and depth sensors were equipped. Since they are propelled by a buoyancy engine, gliders have moving parts that are only active occasionally, so there are minimal mechanical vibrations and noise, making them excellent vehicles for sensitive instrumentation including microstructure probes and acoustic sensors.

Many existing oceanographic sensors have been modified to fit into a glider, or designed specifically for gliders. These include:

- Fluorometers
- Photosynthetically Available Radiation (PAR) sensors
- Dissolved Oxygen optodes
- Acoustic Doppler Current Profilers (ADCP)
- Laser In-Situ Scattering and Transmissometry (LISST) instruments
- Nitrate sensors
- Active acoustics
- Passive acoustic monitoring (PAM)
- Shadowgraph cameras
- Microstructure (turbulence) probes
- Hydrocarbon sensors

The number of sensors a glider can be equipped with depends on how much space there is for sensors in its hull. Slocum gliders have modular hulls and can be extended to allow for new sensors to be added, other types of gliders only have their initial surface area that may be instrumented. For data reasons instruments may require special positioning, such as on the top of the vehicle to capture light penetration from the surface, or at the very front of the vehicle, outside of the area where the vehicle influences the water's flow for microstructure probes. The number of sensors may also be restricted by the power required to run them.

== See also ==
- Autonomous underwater vehicle – Uncrewed underwater vehicle with autonomous guidance system
- Argo floats – International oceanographic observation program
- Liquid Robotics – American marine robotics corporation, developers of the Wave Glider
- Paravane (weapon) – Minesweeping device
- Paravane (water kite) – Towed hydrofoiled underwater object
- DeepFlight Super Falcon – Winged personal submarine
- Autonomous Robotics Ltd – UK company developing an autonomous underwater vehicle
- Hybrid airship – proposed use of underwater glider principles to improve range of airships
