= Seaglider =

Deep diving autonomous underwater vehicle for long term missions

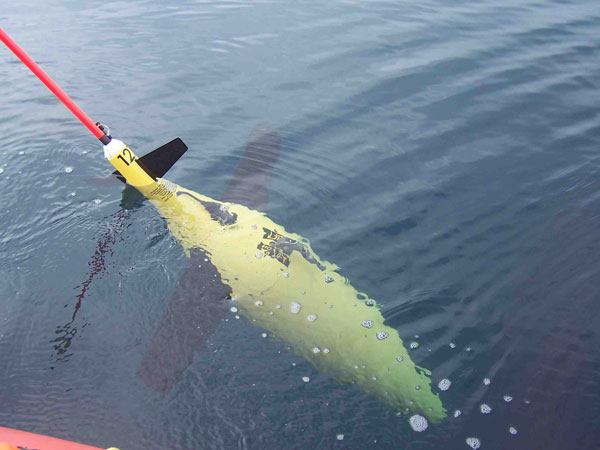

The Seaglider™ is a deep-diving Autonomous Underwater Vehicle (AUV) designed for missions lasting many months and covering thousands of miles. In military applications the Seaglider is more commonly referred to as an Unmanned Underwater Vehicle (UUV).

Seaglider was initially developed by the University of Washington (UW) in the 1990s by a team led by professor of oceanography Charles C. Eriksen, with funding primarily from the US Office of Naval Research. In June 2008, iRobot received an exclusive five-year license to produce the Seaglider for customers outside the University of Washington. In May 2013 Kongsberg Underwater Technology, Inc. (part of Kongsberg Maritime) announced that they had completed negotiations with the University of Washington's Center for Commercialization to obtain the sole rights to produce, market and continue the development of Seaglider technology. The Seaglider license was in Kongsberg's subsidiary Hydroid, Inc., which was sold to Huntington Ingalls Industries (HII) in March 2020. In 2024 the license was transferred back to UW; it now resides in UW's Integrative Observational Platforms (IOP) Seaglider group, which currently (as of 2025) manufactures and supports the gliders.

== Systems ==
Seaglider measures temperature, salinity and other quantities in the ocean, sending back data using global satellite telemetry. Seaglider UUVs are in use worldwide, collecting oceanic physical properties and performing various other missions for oceanographers, including the U.S. Navy, government agencies, universities, and research organizations.

Seaglider "flies" through the water with extremely modest energy requirements using changes in buoyancy for thrust. It has a pressure vessel containing its batteries, electronics, motors, etc., with a surrounding fairing that gives it a stable low-drag hydrodynamic shape. Designed to operate at depths of up to 1,000 meters, the hull compresses as it sinks to match the glider's density to the increasing density of the seawater. It changes buoyancy by inflating or deflating a bladder external to the pressure vessel, making the glider rise or sink. This vertical motion is converted to horizontal motion via the glider's wings so that it moves forward at a slant. The glider thus flies in a zigzag pattern from the surface to the maximum desired depth and back to the surface again. Whenever it surfaces, it can connect via satellite to a shore-side base station to upload data and download new piloting instructions.

== Missions ==
In May 2010 Seaglider was deployed in the Gulf of Mexico to help monitor and gather data during the Deepwater Horizon oil spill incident.

In 2013 the US Navy tested Seaglider for use in the Littoral combat ship.

As of 2016, the US Navy was deploying LBS-Glider from T-AGS and was preparing to deploy from DDGs.

== See also ==
- Liquid Robotics's Wave Glider
