= AUV-150 =

Unmanned underwater vehicle

External image
- Autonomous Underwater Vehicle-150
- AUV-150 Test Trial

AUV (Autonomous Underwater Vehicle) - 150 is an unmanned underwater vehicle (UUV) being developed by Central Mechanical Engineering Research Institute (CMERI) scientists in Durgapur in the Indian state of West Bengal. The project is sponsored by the Ministry of Earth Sciences and has technical assistance from IIT-Kharagpur. (Note: AUV-150; CSIR News, September 2011)

The vehicle was built with the intent of coastal security like mine counter-measures, coastal monitoring and reconnaissance. AUV 150 can be used to study aquatic life, for mapping of sea-floor and minerals along with monitoring of environmental parameters, such as current, temperature, depth and salinity. It can also be useful in cable and pipeline surveys. It is built to operate 150 metres under the sea and have cruising speed of up to four knots.

== Description ==
=== Structure ===
AUV-150 is cylindrical-shaped with streamlined fairing to reduce hydrodynamic drag. It is embedded with advanced power, propulsion, navigation, and control systems. The UUV includes a pressurized cabin which is necessary for the diving and flotation system to work properly; this also helps to increase its sealing power against water leakage into the cabin. The AUV 150 weighs 490 kg, is 4.8 metres long and has a diameter of 50 cm. (Note: "India-made stealth submarine to be tested next month". The Times of India. 20 February 2010.)

=== Control system ===
The AUV is autonomous, that is automatic and self-controlled. It has an onboard computer that can be pre-programmed to dive to preset depths, move along preset trajectories, and return to the base after completing the assigned tasks. A remote control option is provided in order to perform special tasks.

=== Propulsion ===
It is propelled by water-jet propulsion which comprises thrusters for generating motion in different directions to control surge, sway, heave, pitch, and yaw, while preventing the vehicle from rolling. Two arrays of cross-fins have also been fixed at the two ends to provide additional stability to the AUV.

=== Navigation ===
The autonomous vehicle is equipped with a number of navigational equipment to locates its own geographical position Such as inertial navigation system, depth sonar, altimeter, doppler velocity log, global positioning system through ultra-short baseline system and forward looking sonar to facilitate obstacle evasion and safe passage.

=== Payload ===
It is equipped with an underwater video camera that can send wireless video pictures from underwater to a monitor above water surface along with side scan sonar. The submarine is equipped with CTD or conductivity-temperature-depth recorder and several sensors that can measure orientation, current and speed.

=== Communication ===
For smooth communication and distant intervention, the vehicle is equipped with hybrid communication system: it uses radio frequency while on surface and acoustic under water.

=== Power ===
The vehicle uses a Lithium polymer battery and can operate up to depths of 150 metres at speeds of 2-4 knots.

== Test trial ==
A full-scale prototype of AUV- 150 was put to sheltered freshwater test in January 2010 under tight security. It was brought in a truck from Durgapur in West Bengal under secrecy inside a container up to Kulamavu reservoir at Idukki in Kerala and the vehicle was later taken to the middle of the reservoir on a boat. The choice fell on Idukki Since Kulamavu has a centre associated with Indian Navy and the reservoir being very deep. The biggest arch dam of Asia, Idukki reservoir is located about 250 km from Kerala's capital Thiruvananthapuram, and its lake covers an area of 60 km^{2}. The preliminary test was conducted for seven to eight days and the results was reported to be very satisfactory. The final leg of the still-water trials was conducted in the reservoir between September and October 2010.

== Sea trial ==
The first series of sea trials of AUV-150 was commenced from 13 July 2011 off the Chennai coast. From July 13 to July 16 the diving depth of the AUV-150 was increased in stages, it reached consecutive depths of 35,79m 79.86m and 119.95m and finally on 17 July 2011 Auv-150 reached the specified depth of 150 m. Despite extreme rough sea environments (Sea-state of 4), the sea trial was satisfactory. Although minor problem was faced in recording video frames.

== See also ==
- Indigenous Indian armed drones for air warfare and surveillance
- Indian AUVs for underwater warfare and surveillance
  - AUV 150
  - Maya AUV India
- Indian Extra-Large unmanned undersea vehicle (ELUUV) for underwater warfare and surveillance
  - Indian ELUUV
