= Variable-buoyancy propulsion =

Use of a buoyancy engine to provide propulsion

In engineering, variable-buoyancy propulsion is the use of a buoyancy engine to provide propulsion for a vehicle. The concept was first explored in the 1960s for use with underwater gliders, but has since been applied to autonomous aircraft as well.

== Principle ==
Variable-buoyancy propulsion is based on the ability of a vehicle to change its buoyancy from negative to positive and vice versa (for aircraft, this means alternating between being heavier and lighter than air). While positively buoyant, the vehicle trims bow up and uses its hydrofoils or wings to glide forward while rising, using buoyancy as the driving force. At the top of the climb, buoyancy is made negative and the vehicle trims bow down and glides forward while descending, using gravity as the driving force. The process can be repeated for as long as the buoyancy engine can operate, and allows for highly energy-efficient albeit generally slow propulsion. The vehicle's trajectory typically presents a sawtooth-like profile. Various methods may be used to alter the buoyancy.
