= Maya AUV India =

Autonomous underwater vehicle from National Institute of Oceanography, India

Maya AUV
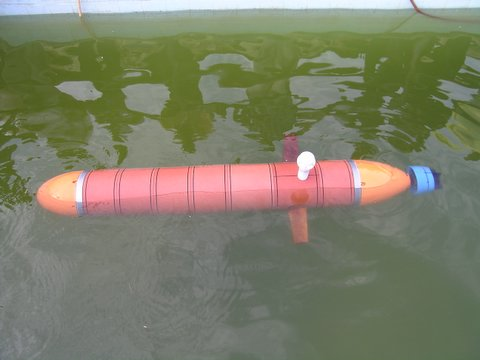
- Maya AUV at National Institute of Oceanography, Dona Paula, Goa, India
- Manufacturer: National Institute of Oceanography, India
- Country: India
- Year of creation: 2003-2007
- Type: Autonomous underwater vehicle
- Purpose: Chemical Oceanography, Biological Oceanography, Oceanography, and Data collection
- Website: www.nio.org

Maya AUV is an autonomous underwater vehicle (AUV), developed by the Marine Instrumentation Division at the National Institute of Oceanography (NIO), India.

== Description ==
The Maya AUV belongs to a class of small autonomous underwater vehicles that have been gaining popularity in marine application areas such as oceanography, monitoring the coastal environment, as well as in naval applications such as mapping of naval mines for mine countermeasures.

The vehicle has an endurance of 7.2 hours, a total length of approximately 1.7 m, a diameter of 0.234 m with a slender-ellipsoid nose that is free-flooding and houses scientific payloads. The nose-cone is designed to be swappable to use alternate scientific sensors depending upon the application. The main pressurized hull of the AUV is rated to 200m depth operations and houses the electronics, navigation sensors, batteries as well as the actuators for the rudders and fins. The AUV is propelled by a single rear thruster in the aft section which also houses a mast for the GPS and communication antennae. Navigation sensors include a Doppler Velocity Log and a MEMS Inertial Measurement Unit. The vehicle weighs approximately 54 kg in air, with the main hull built from an aluminum alloy. It is powered by lithium polymer batteries and has a nominal speed of 1.5 m/s.

== Development ==
The development of Maya was jointly funded by NIO and the Department of Electronics and Information Technology, New Delhi, India (known as the Department of Information Technology before 2012). The AUV's development began in 2003, completed horizontal plane tests in May 2005, with the first set of dive missions tested on May 12, 2006, making it India's first indigenously developed AUV for scientific applications.

Part of the Maya AUV development was done under the scope of an Indo-Portuguese collaboration that aimed to build and test the joint operation of two AUVs for marine science applications via AdI Portugal (MAYASub project). Sensors used in the Maya AUV include Aanderaa dissolved oxygen sensor, WetLabs chlorophyll and turbidity sensors, RBR CTD (instrument) and a TRIOS "hyper spectral radiometers". The AUV uses standard LQ controllers for control in the horizontal and vertical planes. NIO signed agreements for the licensing of AUV technology with VEA Automation and Robotics in 2009 and L&T, in 2010.

== See also ==
- Indigenous Indian armed drones for air warfare and surveillance
- Indian AUVs for underwater warfare and surveillance
  - AUV-150
  - Maya AUV India
- Indian Extra-Large unmanned undersea vehicle (ELUUV) for underwater warfare and surveillance
  - Indian ELUUV
