= Intervention AUV =

Type of autonomous underwater vehicle capable of autonomous interventions

Intervention AUV or I-AUV is a type of autonomous underwater vehicle. Its characteristic feature is that it is capable of autonomous interventions on the subsea installations, a task usually carried out by remotely operated underwater vehicles (ROVs) or human divers.

== Before I-AUVs ==
Basic maintenance as well as repairs were traditionally done by human divers equipped with the appropriate pressure-resistant suits. Such operations were burdened with a high dependency on weather and involved direct hazards on humans. Due to slow exhaustion of the shallow oil sources, the oil wells were installed in deeper water (>500m of depth). This made diver operation less feasible due to heavy suits and higher associated risks. Beginning in the 1980s, those duties were gradually taken over by ROVs which were reaching a status of a proven tool.

Both methods of intervention require mobilization of surface support vessel which is necessary either to supply and retrieve the divers or to deploy and control the ROV at work. The costs of maintaining such vessels or hiring them to complete an intervention are high (in the order of hundreds of thousands USD for a day of operation) and contribute significantly towards the operational expenses connected to running the field.

== Beginnings of the concept ==
After AUVs reached the stage of development allowing commercial application, hydrographic, fishing and oil exploration businesses quickly adapted them for several tasks like bottom mapping or water column measurements. Most of the application, however, involved survey AUVs for data collection.

Progress in computational power and techniques, development of underwater navigation systems (like Ultra-short baseline or Sonar), acoustic modems and cameras made it possible to build vehicles that could be controlled precisely enough to execute an intervention mission requiring precise positioning & control and a level of reasoning about the environment. For intervention missions, a manipulator is attached to the AUV resulting in an underwater vehicle-manipulator system. Such missions might include manipulating valves on an oilfield Christmas tree or, at a more advanced stage, retrieving a biological specimen from the seafloor for scientific study. Further research will probably extend the list of possible operations of I-AUVs.

== Future ==
In the near future ROVs, AUVs and related underwater robots are expected to have truly human diver equivalent international capabilities. The most important anthropomorphic capabilities include human finger like grasping. Besides capability of swimming an underwater robot also has multi DOF manipulators and end effectors on these arms of various types to perform underwater tasks such as construction, salvage, rescue and repair. Another future development is the coordination of several AUVs to approach complex tasks, like the TWINBOT project.

== Examples ==
- 2018 TWINBOT project by the Universitat Jaume I, Universitat de Girona and Universitat de les Illes Balears.
- 2011 RAUVI project by the Universitat Jaume I, Universitat de Girona and Universitat de les Illes Balears.
- 2008 Nessie AUV by the Ocean Systems Lab, Heriot-Watt University, winner twice running of SAUC-E.
- 1996 OTTER I-AUV by the Stanford Aerospace Robotics Lab
- 2003 ALIVe AUV by Cybernetix and Ocean Systems Lab, Heriot-Watt University
- SAUVIM by University of Hawaii
- VORTEX in UNION project
- 2021 IDEX AUV SWARM by Sagar Defence Engineering Pvt Ltd

== See also ==
- Remotely operated underwater vehicle (ROV) – A tethered underwater mobile device operated by a remote crew
- Well intervention – Operation on a deteriorating oil well
