= Liquid Robotics =

American marine robotics corporation

- Type: Subsidiary
- Founded: 2007; 19 years ago
- Headquarters: Herndon, Virginia and Kamuela, Hawaii, US
- Key people: Graham Hine (CEO)
- Products: Wave Glider and associated services
- Parent: Boeing
- Website: https://www.liquid-robotics.com

Liquid Robotics is an American marine robotics corporation that designs, manufactures and sells the Wave Glider, a wave and solar powered unmanned surface vehicle (USV). The Wave Glider harvests energy from ocean waves for propulsion. With this energy source, Wave Gliders can spend many months at a time at sea, collecting and transmitting ocean data.

The vehicles host sensor payloads such as: atmospheric and oceanographic sensors applicable to ocean and climate science, seismic sensors for earthquake and tsunami detection, and video cameras and acoustic sensors for security and marine environment protection purposes.

The company was founded in 2007 in Sunnyvale, California. In December 2016, the company was acquired by The Boeing Company and is a wholly owned subsidiary, part of Boeing’s Defense, Space and Security organization. In February 2022 the company relocated to Herndon, Virginia.

== History ==
The Wave Glider was originally invented to record the singing of humpback whales and transmit the songs back to shore. In 2003, Joe Rizzi, Chairman, Jupiter Research Foundation, set out with the goal to design a system that could hold its position at sea—even if it wasn’t anchored in place—and operate 24/7 without harming the environment or the whales.

After a few years of experimenting, he enlisted the Hine family to help develop an unmoored, station-keeping data buoy. Roger Hine, a mechanical engineer and robotics expert from Stanford University, spent a year on the project experimenting with different designs and energy sources. In 2005, he invented the Wave Glider and in January 2007, Roger Hine and Joe Rizzi co-founded Liquid Robotics.

In January 2009, endurance testing began when a Wave Glider completed a nine-day circumnavigation of Hawaii's Big Island. Later that year a pair of Wave Gliders travelled from Hawai’i to San Diego, an 82-day trip that covered more than 2,500 miles. Since then Wave Gliders have travelled over 1.4 million nautical miles over the course of over 32,000 vehicle-days at sea.

In September 2014, Liquid Robotics entered partnership with The Boeing Company for the purpose of advancing maritime surveillance. Over the next three years, the two companies worked on integrating unmanned systems to provide a seafloor to space communications capability for anti-submarine warfare. During the Unmanned Warrior 2016 exercise hosted by the Royal British Navy, Boeing and Liquid Robotics demonstrated for the first time a network of persistent USVs that detected, reported and tracked a live diesel submarine. On December 6, 2016, Boeing acquired Liquid Robotics.

== Wave Glider ==
=== Architecture ===
The Wave Glider is composed of two parts: the ‘’float’’, roughly the size and shape of a large surfboard, travels on the surface of the ocean; the ‘’sub’’ or wing rack hangs below on an umbilical tether 13–26 feet (4–8 meters) long and is equipped with a rudder for steering and a thruster for additional thrust during extreme conditions (doldrums or high currents). The Wave Glider leverages the difference in motion between the ocean surface and the calmer water below to create forward propulsion. No fuel is required for operation which enables it to stay at sea for long durations.

=== Next Generation Wave Glider ===
On September 7, 2017, Liquid Robotics announced the Next Generation Wave Glider with advancements to the platform’s operational range, and performance for missions in high sea states (sea state 6 and greater) and high latitudes. Changes include advancements for expanded sensor payloads and increased energy and storage capacity required for long duration maritime surveillance, environmental monitoring and observation missions.

Solar panels recharge batteries which supply the power for the onboard sensor payloads, communications, computing, and enables a thruster propulsion system that provides additional navigational thrust for challenging ocean conditions (doldrums through high seas). The vehicle can be programmed for autonomous operation, or it can be piloted remotely. Communication is provided via satellite, BGAN, cellular or Wi-Fi links for piloting and data transmission.

=== Software ===
The Wave Glider software is built on open standards and composed of two parts:

- Regulus, the on-board operating environment built on Linux and Java and used for on-board command and control of all Wave Glider functions including sensors.
- WGMS is a web-based console for mission management that supports mission planning, piloting and data management.

=== Markets and missions ===
Wave Gliders are used for defense, maritime surveillance, commercial, oil and gas, and science and research applications. Examples include:

- Commercial/Oil and Gas – atmospheric, seismic, and environmental monitoring
- Defense - Anti-submarine warfare and Intelligence, Surveillance and Recognizance
- Maritime surveillance – surface vessel detection for coastal and border security
- Scientific research – weather monitoring, climate change, deep-sea seismic detection, ocean acidification, environmental monitoring, bio-geophysical research and fish/ecosystems monitoring

Since 2007, Wave Gliders have been deployed in many areas of the global ocean, from the Arctic to the Southern Ocean. They've been used to track great white sharks by Dr. Barbara Block of Hopkins Marine Station, patrol marine protected areas (MPAs) for the United Kingdom’s Foreign & Commonwealth Office to protect against illegal fishing and assessed the health of the Great Barrier Reef and ecosystems. Additionally, they’ve collected and transmitted data through extreme storms and detected a live diesel submarine during the Unmanned Warrior exercise conducted in October of 2016.

== Guinness World Record ==
In 2013 Liquid Robotics was awarded the Guinness World Record for the "longest journey by an autonomous, unmanned surface vehicle on the planet". The Wave Glider, named Benjamin Franklin, travelled farther than any other unmanned autonomous surface vehicle – over 7939 nautical miles (14,703 km) on an autonomous journey of just over one-year. The Wave Glider’s route traveled across the Pacific Ocean from San Francisco, CA to Bundaberg, Queensland Australia arriving on 14 February 2013.

== Digital Ocean ==
Digital Ocean is an initiative originated by Liquid Robotics to collaboratively establish the data collection and communications infrastructure needed to support the Internet of Things for the ocean. The vision for the Digital Ocean is a networked ocean connecting billions of sensors, manned and unmanned systems, and satellites above. The goal of the project is to address issues facing the ocean as noted in the UN’s Sustainable Development Goal #14 and to conserve and sustainably use the oceans, seas and marine resources.

== Strategic Advisory Board ==
Liquid Robotics established the Strategic Advisory Board in September 2011. The distinguished board of advisors include:

- Robert S. Gelbard, Chairman, Washington Global Partners, LLC, former Foreign Service Officer, U.S. Department of State, Ambassador to Indonesia and Bolivia
- Walter L. Sharp, General, U.S. Army (Ret.)
- Dr. Eric Terrill, Director, Coastal Observing Research and Development Center (CORDC), Scripps Institution of Oceanography, University of California, San Diego (UCSD)
- John J. Young Jr., Principal, JY Strategies, LLC, former U.S. Undersecretary of Defense for Acquisition, Technology and Logistics
- Sir George Zambellas, Admiral (ret.), former First Sea Lord of the British Royal Navy and Chief of the Naval Staff
