= Disappearance of ARA San Juan =

2017 submarine disaster

- ARA San Juan (Argentina)
- Date: 15 November 2017
- Location: South Atlantic; 45°56′59″S 59°46′22″W
- Cause: Implosion
- Outcome: Loss of the boat, crew
- Deaths: 44 (all)

On 15 November 2017, the Argentine submarine ARA San Juan disappeared in the South Atlantic off the coast of Argentina while on a training exercise. After a search lasting 15 days, the Argentine Navy downgraded the operation from a rescue mission to a search for the submarine's wreck, implying they had given up hope of finding survivors among its crew of 44. It was the worst submarine disaster since the accident on Chinese submarine 361 in 2003, and the second worst peacetime naval disaster in Argentina after the 1949 sinking of the minesweeper ARA Fournier.

On 16 November 2018, a year after the disappearance of the submarine, her wreck was found in the South Atlantic by the private company Ocean Infinity at a depth of 907 metres (2,976 ft) at 45°56′59″S 59°46′22″W.

== Background ==
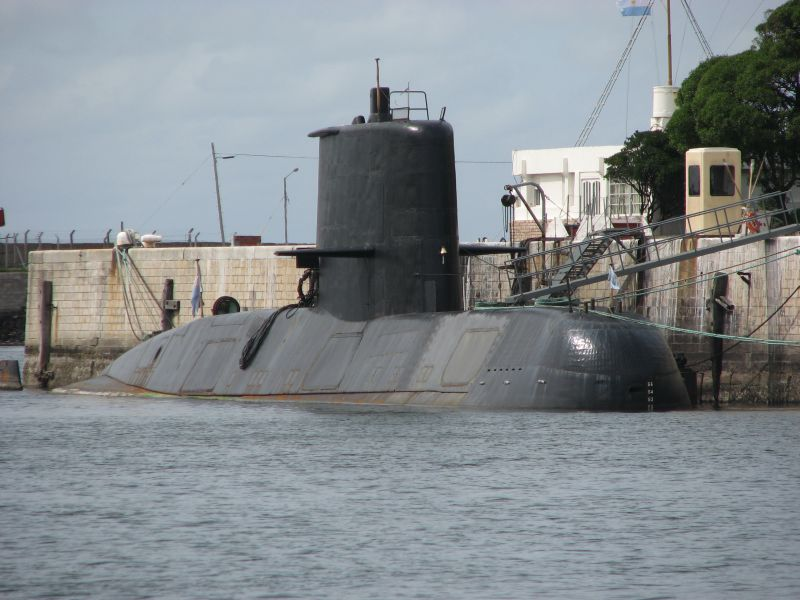
ARA San Juan (S-42) in 2007

ARA San Juan (S-42), a TR-1700-class diesel-electric submarine in service with the Argentine Navy since 19 November 1985, was built in West Germany by Thyssen Nordseewerke. She was laid down on 18 March 1982 and launched on 20 June 1983. San Juan underwent a mid-life update from 2008 to 2013, which included replacing all battery elements.

In early November 2017, San Juan was part of a navy exercise in Tierra del Fuego which included the sinking of the ex ARA Comodoro Somellera as a target. With the war game completed and after a short visit to Ushuaia open to the public, the submarine got underway to her home base at Mar del Plata.

== Disappearance and rescue efforts ==
On 17 November 2017, it was announced that she had not been heard from since 15 November, and that a search and rescue operation had been launched 200 nautical miles (370 km; 230 mi) southeast of the San Jorge Gulf. There were at least 44 servicemen on board the missing submarine, including Argentina's first female submarine officer, Eliana Krawczyk. The submarine carried oxygen for no more than seven days when submerged.

On the same day, Argentine president Mauricio Macri moved to the official residence at Chapadmalal, near Mar del Plata, in order to follow the search and rescue operation more closely. The Argentine Armed Forces set up a centre of operations at the naval base in Mar del Plata, with family members of the submariners also present at the base. The Argentine Navy brought in a team of mental health professionals to aid the families; a team to keep them updated on the search and rescue effort had also been set up. Also on 17 November, the International Charter 'Space and Major Disasters' was activated by the Secretaría Nacional de Protección Civil de Argentina, thus providing for humanitarian satellite coverage.

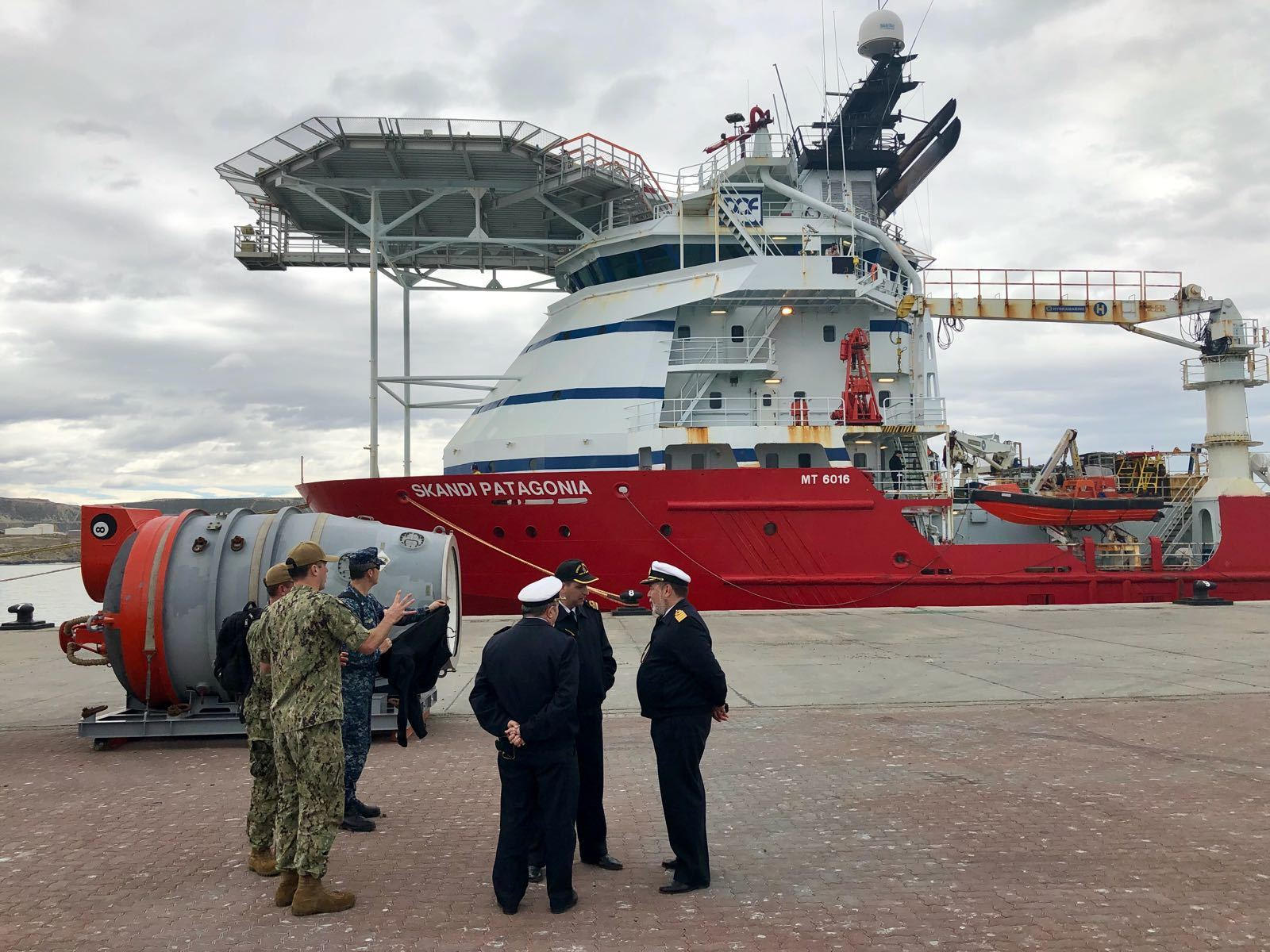
Argentine and US sailors in front of the Subsea Construction Support Vessel Skandi Patagonia

On 18 November, the Ministry of Defense reported that there had been attempts at communication that day from a satellite phone that was believed to be from the submarine, but it was later determined that the calls were not from the vessel.

On 19 November, the Argentine Armed Forces stated that severe weather with 8-metre (26 ft) waves in the area was hampering the search effort and that weather conditions would not be favourable until 21 November.

On 20 November, the Argentine Navy announced that the "critical phase" for the rescue was approaching. Although the submarine had enough supplies to last 90 days above water, she only had enough oxygen for 7–10 days submerged and it was speculated that she was submerged when communications were lost given the rough weather. The Navy also stated that if the issue had simply been a communications failure, then San Juan would have arrived at Mar del Plata on 19 or 20 November. The Argentine Navy later reported that sonar systems on two of its ships and sonar buoys dropped by a US P-8A Poseidon aircraft detected noises possibly coming from San Juan; a senior United States Navy officer told CNN that this sounded like banging on the hull in order to alert passing ships; later analysis of the audio determined that the sound "did not correspond to a submarine", and was probably of biological origin. By the end of the day the oceanographic vessels of the Argentine Navy Puerto Deseado and Austral with support of the icebreaker Almirante Maximiano of the Brazilian Navy carried out an extensive scan in the place where the biological sound started. The Royal Navy stated that 10-metre (33 ft) waves had slowed the search, but easing weather led to improved sonar conditions.

As of 21 November, the search area was 482,507 square kilometres (186,297 sq mi) in size; 15 planes and 17 ships were actively searching the area. Weather conditions improved, with 3–4-metre (9.8–13.1 ft) waves, making the search for the submarine less difficult. The United States Navy later reported that one of its planes had detected a heat signature which corresponded to a metallic object at a depth of 70 metres (230 ft), 300 kilometres (190 mi) off the coast of Puerto Madryn. There was no official confirmation from the Argentine Navy whether the object was indeed San Juan, but sources told Clarín newspaper that a fleet in the area led by the corvette ARA Drummond was given orders to proceed "at full speed" towards where the object was detected. At 7:00 pm the British ship HMS Protector, in her maritime patrol area, had seen three flares to the east: one orange and two white. This information was reported to Puerto Belgrano where the Search and Rescue Coordinating Center is set up. The Argentine Navy later determined that both the flares and heat signature were false leads.

On 22 November, the Argentine Navy investigated a "hydroacoustic anomaly" identified on 15 November, three hours after the last contact of the lost submarine; ships and airplanes were sent back to the last contact point with ARA San Juan. During a search flight over the South Atlantic, a U.S. P-8A Poseidon aircraft detected an object near the area where the missing submarine had sent her last signal. The plane returned to base in Bahía Blanca late the same day.

On 23 November, the Argentine Navy said an event consistent with an explosion had been detected, on the day the submarine lost communications, by CTBTO seismic anomaly listening posts on Ascension Island and Crozet Islands at 46.12°S 59.69°W. The Navy received information through the Argentine ambassador in Austria since the CTBTO is based in Vienna. The organization had been asked to analyse data from the search area by the Argentine government on the week of the disappearance, but no leads had materialised until 22 November when the CTBTO informed the government. In a press conference, the Argentine Navy stated that it had not ruled out any possibilities since the submarine had not been located yet, and a spokesperson requested that the media be more precise when reporting information following "imprecise information which affects the family members." The Navy added that it received information on the explosion on the afternoon of 22 November, adding that it would have concentrated search efforts in that area had it known sooner.

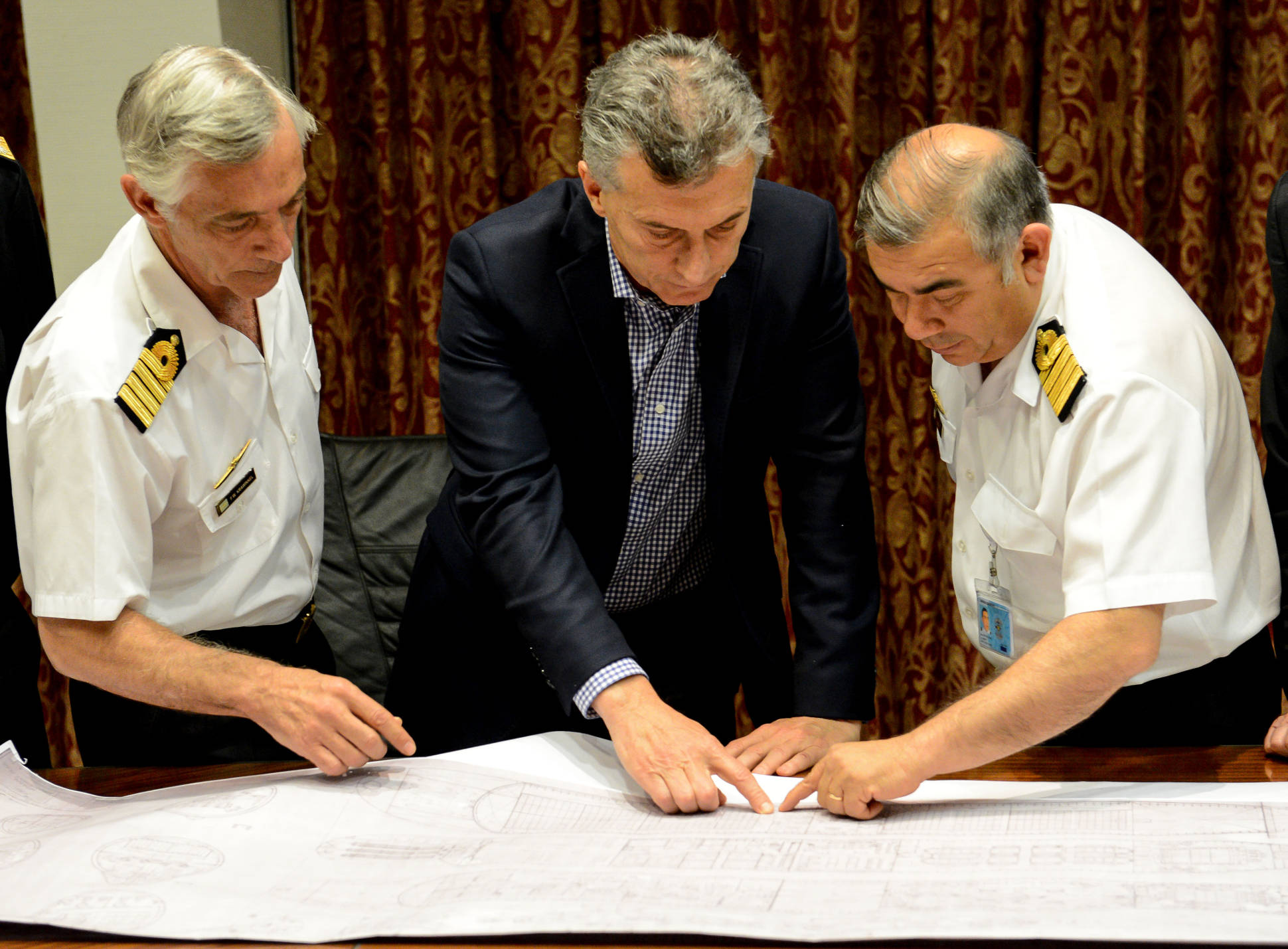
President Macri being informed at the Libertad Building, 24 November 2017

On 24 November, the search and rescue operation was reinforced by the Brazilian submarine rescue ship Felinto Perry. The arrival of a Russian Navy exploration aircraft was also expected. More than 30 aircraft and ships from Argentina, the United Kingdom, Brazil, the United States, Chile and other countries participated in the effort to find San Juan. In all, more than 4,000 personnel from 13 countries assisted the search, scouring some 500,000 square kilometres (190,000 sq mi) of ocean – an area the size of Spain.

On 26 November, the Argentine Navy said that "despite 11 days of searching, it doesn't rule out that [the crew] could be in an extreme survival situation" and were not willing to draw any conclusions until the submarine had been located. Weather conditions in the South Atlantic were again making the search difficult, with winds of up to 100 km/h (62 mph).

On 27 November, Argentine Navy spokesman Captain Enrique Balbi revealed to the press that according to the submarine's last report from 15 November, San Juan's snorkel leaked water into the forward storage batteries the day before, which ignited a fire. After extinguishing the fire, the crew disconnected the forward storage batteries. The submarine continued to move powered by the aft batteries.

On 30 November, 15 days after San Juan went missing, the Navy declared the rescue part of the operation to be over, turning its attention to finding the submarine and not her crew. At the time, the loss of 44 crewmen constituted the largest loss of life aboard a submarine since the Chinese submarine 361 sank in May 2003. The incident is also the second worst naval disaster in Argentina during peacetime after the loss of the minesweeper ARA Fournier with her complement of 77 in the Fuegian Channels on 22 September 1949.

=== Search effort ===
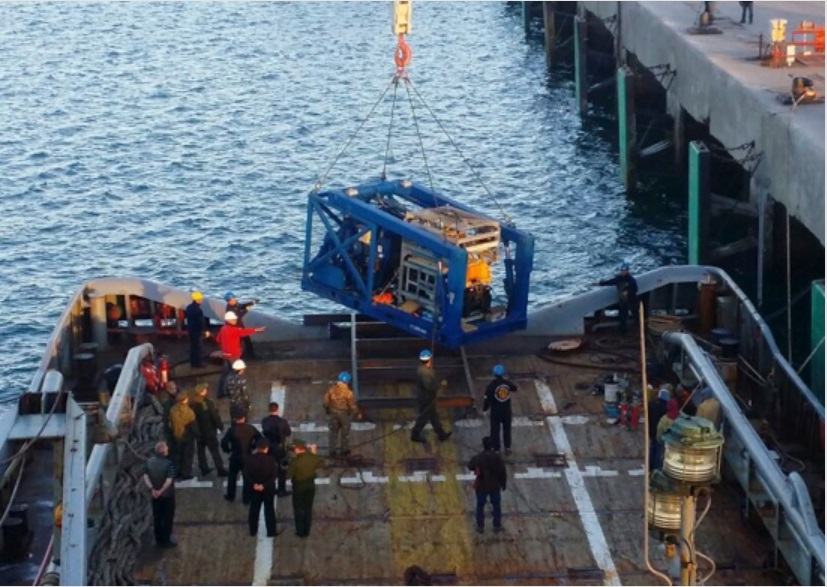
Russian Pantera Plus underwater search vehicle being unloaded

Locating a distressed or sunken submarine can be extremely difficult as witnessed by the disappearances of the French submarines Eurydice (found 53 days after sinking) and Minerve (found in July 2019, 51 years after sinking) despite the fact that both were lost close to the French mainland. The nuclear-powered USS Scorpion was located five months after sinking, largely thanks to data obtained from SOSUS. The Israeli submarine INS Dakar was located in 1999, 31 years after her disappearance. The Australian submarine AE1, disappeared in September 1914, was found in December 2017 (103 years later) after 13 search efforts.

As of 21 November 2017, when including vessels and aircraft making their way to the search area, the Ministry of Defense stated that there were 27 ships and 18 aircraft participating in the search and rescue of San Juan. Of those, 18 ships and 5 aircraft were Argentine, with the remaining 9 ships and 13 aircraft belonging to the 11 other countries which had offered assistance. There were also tens of fishing vessels assisting in the search. The operation was carried out under the auspices of ISMERLO, an international organisation of over 40 countries set up in 2003 following the Kursk submarine disaster.

On 24 November, according to the Argentine Navy, 27 ships, 30 aircraft, 4,000 professionals from 13 countries participated in the search effort to the missing Argentine submarine; this was already the largest search and rescue operation in the history of the South Atlantic Ocean.

International assistance largely ended by early 2018 leaving Argentina as the only country involved in the search. On 14 February 2018 the Argentine Government offered a reward of $98 million pesos (approximately USD 5 million) for information on the location of ARA San Juan.

=== Ocean Infinity search ===
Starting 7 September 2018, the search for the submarine was aided by the US-based seabed survey company Ocean Infinity. The search was planned for up to 60 days, with payment only in the event that the submarine was found. Some 60 crew members conducted the search, with three officers of the Argentine Navy and four family members of the crew of ARA San Juan to observe.

On 16 November 2018, Ocean Infinity reported a new point of interest, 60 metres (200 ft) in length, in Site 1, area 15A-4, of the search zone, some 800 metres (2,600 ft) deep. The Norwegian ship Seabed Constructor was to arrive in the area at 23:30 and investigation with a ROV was to begin. It had been considered that the probability of locating the wreck in the area where it was eventually found was 90%, but previous searches failed to find it due to inadequate technology and presence of numerous submarine canyons.

Later that day (a year and a day after its sinking) the submarine was found in the Atlantic Ocean at a depth of 907 metres (2,976 ft) at 45°56′59″S 59°46′22″W, 20 km (11 nmi; 12 mi) north northwest from the seismic anomaly reported by the CTBTO. Photographs were released showing it broken into several pieces on the ocean floor. Argentine Navy spokesman Captain Jorge Balbi presented close-up photos of the wreck in a press briefing. The pictures show the imploded pressure hull, with the bow section, sail and propellers scattered in an area of 8,000 square metres (86,000 ft^{2}).

Ocean Infinity was to receive a reward of US$7.5 million for finding the missing vessel.

== Consequences and repercussions ==
On 16 December 2017, the Argentine defence minister dismissed the Navy's Chief of the General Staff (Marcelo Srur) –the head of Argentine Navy– after the incident. On 4 February 2018 the Argentine news site Infobae published two documents handed by the Argentine Navy to the judge in charge of investigating the accident, detailing how the mission of the submarine included spying on British civil and military vessels in the South Atlantic, near the Falkland Islands.

In 2026, a court in Río Gallegos, Santa Cruz, Argentina, convicted former Argentine Navy commander Claudio Villamide for his role in the 2017 implosion of the submarine ARA San Juan, which killed all 44 people on board.

== Participants of the rescue and search efforts ==
Country	Rescue	Search	Effort or pledge
Argentina	Yes	Yes	The initial search and rescue operation was carried out by the destroyer Sarandí and the corvettes Rosales and Drummond, supported by two S-2E Tracker surveillance aircraft. On 18 November, CONICET provided the ships ARA Austral and Puerto Deseado, and the Argentine Navy added ARA Robinson, Spiro, Patagonia, La Argentina and Bahía San Blas to the search along with a Eurocopter Fennec. The Argentine Air Force provided Lockheed C-130 Hercules aircraft. The Argentine Naval Prefecture is providing the vessels Doctor Manuel Mantilla and Tango, along with a Beechcraft Super King; INVAP and the National Space Activities Commission are providing satellite support and using satellite photography to search for clues in the area. On 24 November the tugboat ARA Puerto Argentino got underway from Comodoro to the search area of ARA San Juan to carry out a "mapping of the bottom of the sea".
Brazil	Yes	Yes	The Brazilian Air Force provided a Lockheed P-3 Orion and an EADS CASA C-295 to aid search efforts; the Brazilian Navy provided the frigate Rademaker, icebreaker Almirante Maximiano, and submarine tender ship Felinto Perry. According to information from the Naval Operations Command, 500 Brazilian military personnel were distributed among the three vessels and 2 two aircraft were sent to assist the Argentine Navy.
Canada	Yes	No	The government sent a Challenger aircraft carrying CO2 absorbing lithium hydroxide curtains and oxygen generating candles, in order to prolong the breathable air in the submarine should contact be made.
Chile	Yes	Yes	The Chilean Navy sent an EADS CASA C-295 and the research vessel Cabo de Hornos to assist the search.
Colombia	Yes	?	Offered a CASA/IPTN CN-235 aircraft of the Colombian Air Force.
Ecuador	Yes	?	The Ecuadorian Navy offered a CN-295 Persuader maritime patrol aircraft.
France	Yes	?	Offered a Falcon 50 search plane of the French Naval Aviation.
Germany	Yes	?	Offered a Lockheed P-3 Orion aircraft of the Marineflieger (German Naval Aviation).
NATO	Yes	?	The NATO Submarine Rescue System has been deployed and has the capacity to carry out underwater rescue efforts if needed.
Norway	Yes	?	On 18 November, the private company DOF ASA provided Skandi Patagonia for the search and rescue mission. The vessel had previously aided in the rescue of a cargo ship in the area in 2009 and comes equipped with an ROV, diving bell and sonar. The vessel is accompanied by Sophie Siem, owned by Siem Offshore, carrying additional rescue equipment.
Peru	Yes	?	Offered assistance if needed, including a Fokker 60 of the Peruvian Naval Aviation.
Russia	Yes	Yes	On 22 November, Russian President Vladimir Putin called the Argentine President Mauricio Macri, offering support. The equipment sent by the country includes special purpose ship Yantar and the unmanned underwater vehicle Pantera Plus. Experts were also being flown to Argentina aboard a military aircraft. On 23 November, an Antonov An-124 arrived in Comodoro Rivadavia carrying the equipment and personnel, before continuing to Ushuaia.
Spain	Yes	No	Offered three containers of supplies including oxygen and food rations should an underwater rescue be carried out.
United Kingdom	Yes	Yes	The United Kingdom offered assistance in the form of a C-130 Hercules aircraft based in the Falkland Islands. The ice patrol and survey vessel HMS Protector was re-tasked to join the search and rescue operation on 18 November, with the Submarine Parachute Assistance Group deployed aboard the ship on 19 November. Subsequently, the patrol vessel HMS Clyde also joined the search and rescue operation. On 22 November, a Royal Air Force (RAF) Voyager arrived at General Enrique Mosconi International Airport, Comodoro Rivadavia with submarine detection equipment. This was the first RAF plane to land in Comodoro Rivadavia since before the Falklands War. (Note: According to another source, Nimrod XV226 visited Comandante Espora naval air base in October 1999 for a training exercise.)
United States	Yes	Yes	On 17 November, a U.S. National Aeronautics and Space Administration (NASA) P-3 Orion aircraft, equipped with a magnetometer, gravimeter and other sensors, was redirected from Operation IceBridge to aid in the search. The United States Navy sent a P-8A Poseidon aircraft, the McCann Rescue Chamber and the Submarine Rescue Diving Recompression System. On 19 November, the U.S. Navy sent a second P-8A, and deployed four unmanned underwater vehicles, to assist in the search. Additionally, thirty-six reservists from Navy Reserve Undersea Rescue Command and its headquarters deployed to Skandi Patagonia. The U.S. Air Force supported the effort through Air Mobility Command moving Air Force and Navy personnel, and more than one million pounds of equipment, to Argentina with three C-5M Super Galaxy and seven C-17 Globemaster III cargo aircraft.
Uruguay	Yes	?	Offered assistance if needed and deployed a Naval Aviation Beechcraft Super King Air and the Uruguayan Navy rescue ship ROU Vanguardia.

== Commemoration ==
On 24 October 2021 a monument commemorating the 44 crew members lost was unveiled at the entrance of the Mar del Plata Naval Base.

== See also ==
- ARA Fournier
- List of submarine incidents since 2000
