= Enrique Molina Pico =

Argentine naval officer (1938–2025)

- Born: 16 September 1938; Buenos Aires, Argentina
- Died: 20 September 2025 (aged 87); Buenos Aires, Argentina
- Spouse: María Graciela Quintero Cabrera
- Children: 3
- Military career
- Branch: Argentine Navy
- Awards: Legion of Merit (Officer)

Enrique Emilio Molina Pico (16 September 1938 – 20 September 2025) was an Argentine naval officer and academic. He served as Chief of the General Staff of the Argentine Navy from 1993 to 1996, having previously commanded the destroyer ARA Hércules during the Falklands War and directed Argentine naval participation in the Gulf War. His career also included service as naval attaché to the United States and Canada and as commander of the Sea Fleet and Naval Operations.

After retiring from the navy, Molina Pico served as rector of the Instituto Tecnológico de Buenos Aires from 1999 to 2012 and was a member of the National Academy of Moral and Political Sciences.

== Early life and education ==
Molina Pico was born in Buenos Aires on 16 September 1938, the son of Captain Enrique Molina Pico. He entered the Naval Academy in 1955 at the age of 17, after completing secondary school. He graduated as a midshipman with a gold medal in 1959, qualified as a Maintenance Engineer at the Navy Polytechnic School, and studied at the Naval War College. He later specialized in mining and mine countermeasures with the Italian Navy and attended the French War College. Molina Pico held doctorates in Administrative Sciences, as well as degrees in International Relations and Naval Systems.

== Career ==
=== Military ===
In 1960, Molina Pico took part in a training voyage as a staff officer aboard the Brazilian Navy's training ship. He later served as second-in-command of the minesweeper ARA Tierra del Fuego and the oceanographic vessel ARA Puerto Deseado. He subsequently commanded the ship ARA Comodoro Rivadavia and a minelayer unit.

During the Falklands War in 1982, he commanded the destroyer ARA Hércules. After the conflict he headed the Corvette Division of the Sea Fleet and later held staff positions in Policy and Strategy and Naval Resources. In 1990, during the presidency of Carlos Menem, he was appointed naval attaché to the Argentine Embassy in the United States and Canada, based in Washington, D.C., While in Washington, he concurrently served under United Nations command as Chief of Naval Forces in the Gulf of Fonseca in Central America and helped establish the first United Nations naval force in the Caribbean with Argentine vessels. He was involved in Argentina's participation in the Gulf War, contributing to the planning and logistical coordination of Operation Desert Storm. The deployment was based in Sharjah and Dubai and involved the destroyer ARA Almirante Brown, the corvette ARA Spiro, later replaced by the corvette ARA Rosales and a naval transport.

Molina Pico commanded the Sea Fleet from 1991 to 1992 and became Commander of Naval Operations in December 1992, overseeing maritime patrols and the fight against illegal fishing. On 13 July 1993, President Menem appointed him Chief of the Navy General Staff, replacing Admiral Jorge Eduardo Ferrer. Despite economic restrictions, he expanded operational capacity, and during his tenure from 1993 to 1996, Argentina participated in UN peacekeeping missions in Haiti and Cyprus. His term coincided with Oscar Camilión's tenure as Minister of Defense, a period that saw the abolition of compulsory military service after the murder of conscript Omar Carrasco in an Army barracks in Neuquén. In December 1995, he approved the retirement of officer Alfredo Astiz, who was later convicted of crimes against humanity committed during the last military dictatorship. He resigned in 1996 and was succeeded by Carlos Marrón.

Molina Pico received national and foreign honors, including a decoration from the Argentine Congress for his role in the Falklands War and the Legion of Merit (Officer) from the United States for his service during the Gulf War.

=== Academia ===
Molina Pico was rector of the Instituto Tecnológico de Buenos Aires from 1999 to 2012, helping to establish the university as one of Argentina's leading engineering institutions. In 2013, he became a full member of the National Academy of Moral and Political Sciences, occupying the José de San Martín chair. He was also associated with the Academy of the Sea, the Argentine Council on International Relations, and the National Nautical School Foundation. His academic work addressed strategy, international terrorism, Middle Eastern conflicts, peacekeeping operations, and emerging security challenges.

== Personal life and death ==
Molina Pico was married and had three children.

Molina Pico died at his home in Buenos Aires, on 20 September 2025, four days after his 87th birthday. No cause of death has yet been given.
