= List of ships named Comodoro Rivadavia =

Several ships have been named Comodoro Rivadavia:

- SS Comodoro Rivadavia (1901) – Argentine-flag passenger-cargo liner owned by German company Hamburg Süd and built in 1890 by Reiherstieg Schiffswerfte & Maschinenfabrik, Hamburg as Paraguassu. She was stranded in Argentina in 1903.
- SS Comodoro Rivadavia (1922) – built by Workman, Clark & Company, Belfast in 1905 as Booth Line's passenger-cargo liner Anselm and purchased by Argentina Compañía General de Navegación SA in 1922. She later suffered boiler explosion as Rio Santa Cruz.
- ARA Comodoro Rivadavia (1937), a survey vessel commissioned in 1928 as San Juan she was renamed Comodoro Riavdavia in 1937 and Madryn in 1942. She was sold in 1967.
- MV Comodoro Rivadavia (1951) – an oil tanker built by P. Smit Jr at Rotterdam for YPF, Buenos Aires. Broken up in 1981.
- ARA Comodoro Rivadavia (Q-11), a survey ship commissioned in the Argentine Navy in 1974.

== See also ==
- List of ships named ARA Rivadavia
