= Victoria Villarruel =

Vice President of Argentina since 2023

The Most Excellent Victoria Villarruel
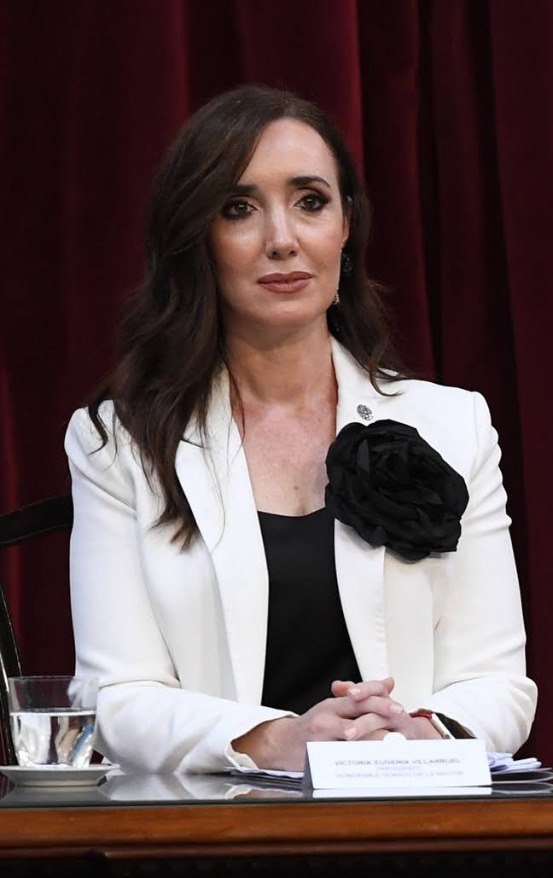
- Villarruel in 2025

38th Vice President of Argentina
- Incumbent
- Assumed office 10 December 2023
- President: Javier Milei
- Preceded by: Cristina Fernández de Kirchner

National Deputy
- In office 10 December 2021 – 29 November 2023
- Constituency: City of Buenos Aires

Personal details
- Born: Victoria Eugenia Villarruel; 13 April 1975 (age 51) Buenos Aires, Argentina
- Party: Democratic (since 2022)
- Other political affiliations: Independent (2021–2022); La Libertad Avanza (since 2021)
- Education: University of Buenos Aires (BA); National Technological University
- Occupation: Lawyer; politician; writer; activist
- Awards: Friend della forze dell'Ordine (2012)

Victoria Eugenia Villarruel (Spanish pronunciation: [bikˈtoɾja ewˈxenja βiʝaˈrwel]; born 13 April 1975) is an Argentine politician, lawyer, writer, and activist who has served as the 38th vice president of Argentina since 2023. Described as a conservative politician, she is the founder of the civil association Centro de Estudios Legales sobre el Terrorismo y sus Víctimas (English: Centre for Legal Studies on Terrorism and its Victims), which she has chaired since its inception. She was a member of the Argentine Chamber of Deputies from 2021 to 2023. Villarruel belongs to the La Libertad Avanza political coalition. She has been accused of Argentine state terrorism denial by several media outlets and human rights organisations. Villarruel denies such accusations, maintaining that she does not support the "National Reorganization Process".

== Early life and education ==
Villarruel was born on 13 April 1975. Her grandfather was a historian employed by the Argentine Navy; according to her, he survived four guerrilla bombings. Her father was a high-ranking Argentine Army member. In 2008, she took a course in Inter-Agency Coordination and Combating Terrorism at the William J. Perry Center for Hemispheric Defense Studies, a U.S. Department of Defense institution based at the National Defense University in Washington, D.C.

== Activism ==
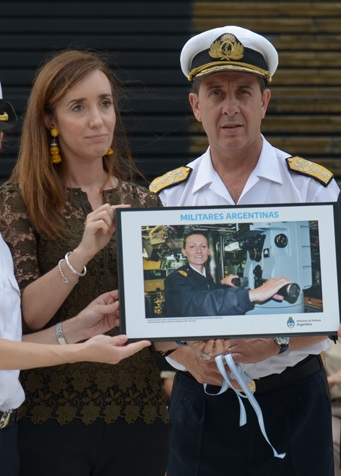
Villarruel and Admiral Julio Horacio Guardia with an image of Eliana Krawczyk

In the early 2000s, Villarruel hosted a radio show called Proyecto Verdad. She started her political activism with Karina Mujica's group, Memoria Completa, according to statements by Pedro Rafael Mercado, a retired Major Colonel and husband of Cecilia Pando.

Villarruel was also part of the Association of Relatives and Friends of Political Prisoners of Argentina (AFyAPPA), of which Pando was president. She protested in front of the Comodoro Py courts together with Pando to demand the release of those convicted of crimes against humanity during the National Reorganization Process. According to Mercado, between 2001 and 2003, she was part of the meetings that would later give rise to Jóvenes por la Verdad, a group of which he was a member, dedicated to organizing visits to Jorge Rafael Videla while he was under house arrest, and which was also in charge of collecting letters for ESMA repressor Ricardo Cavallo while he was imprisoned in Spain, and Villarruel personally arranged for Mercado and his son to meet Videla.

In 2003, she founded the Center for Legal Studies on Terrorism and its Victims (CELTYV), which some human rights organizations in the country repudiated. On 21 December 2005, she participated in the first march of the Association of Relatives and Friends of Political Prisoners of Argentina (AFyAPPA), which criticized Cristina Fernández de Kirchner for calling "those who saved us from subversive terrorism criminals". AFyAPPA is an association that considers military and security forces personnel prosecuted by the civilian justice system for their participation in state terrorism during the last military dictatorship to be political prisoners and calls for their release.

In 2011, Villarruel spoke at the Oslo Freedom Forum, where she disputed the 'official history' of Argentina. She argued that terrorism occurred not only during Argentina's Dirty War under military rule but also between 1973 and 1976 under a democratic government. Villarruel's point of view was that organized terrorism also occurred between 1973 and 1976, when it had a democratic government. She postulated that the two major Argentine guerrilla groups of that era, the People's Revolutionary Army and Montoneros, had links with the Castro regime in Cuba and with the Palestine Liberation Organization (PLO), with at least one of the groups training Islamists in the Middle East and supplying the PLO with weapons that were used in deadly attacks on Israel. Villarruel said that this history was later covered up by the Kirchner government, that the terrorists of the 1970s went on to enjoy the Kirchners' protection, and that many of those former terrorists held positions of responsibility in the Argentine establishment, citing civil servants or journalists. In her talk, Villarruel also accused the Kirchner government of acting in complicity with Iran.

Villarruel’s 2014 book, Los otros muertos, has been criticized for errors, like listing 84 unknown victims from before the formation of the groups she identifies as terrorists and failing to differentiate between civilian deaths and military casualties. According to Villarruel, the majority of their crimes had in fact been committed during the three years of democracy immediately prior to the 1976 military coup. Because of her criticism of the terrorists and of their rehabilitation, she has been accused of defending the Dirty War.

== Political career ==
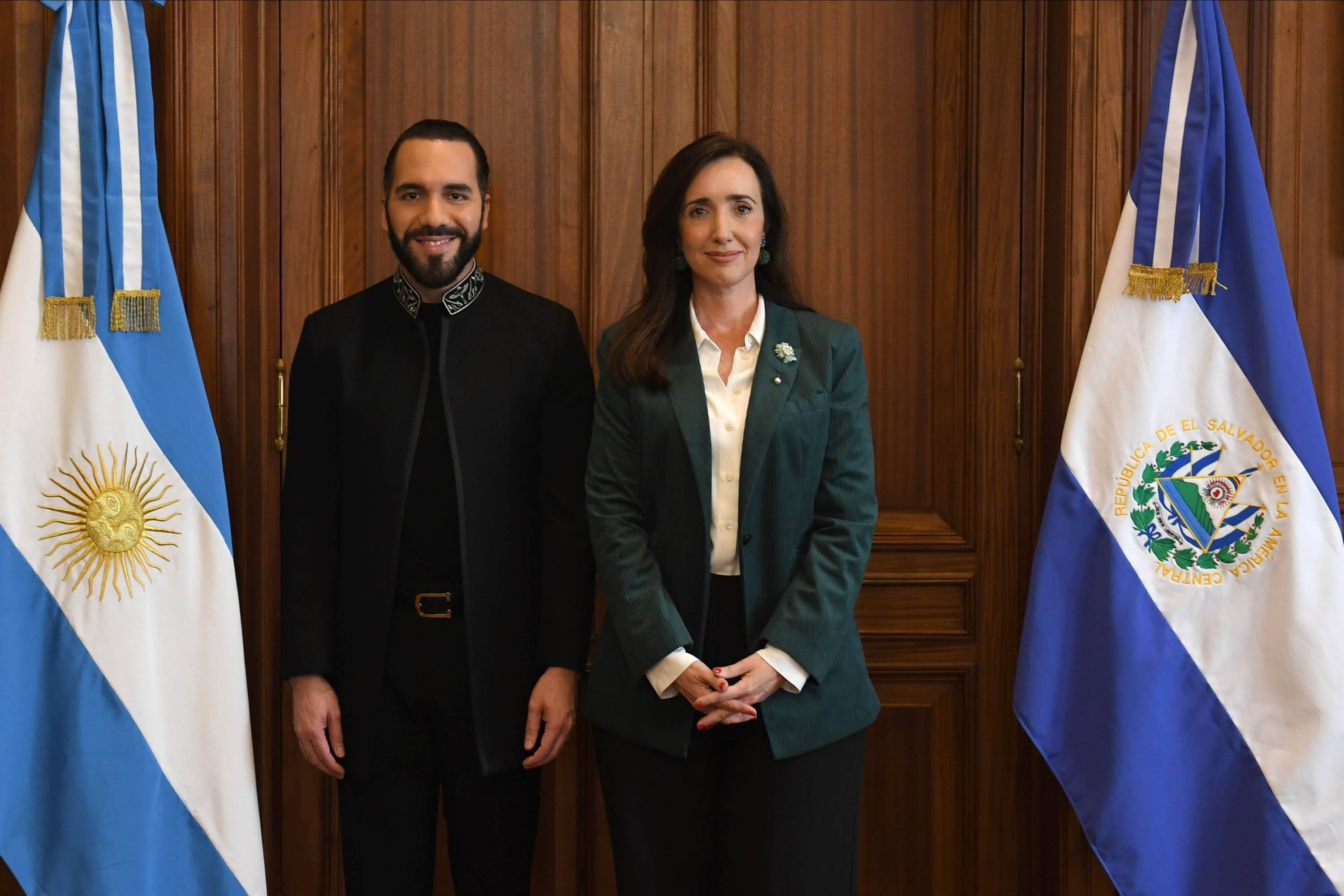
Villarruel and Salvadoran president Nayib Bukele in October 2024

In 2020, Villarruel signed the Madrid Charter, a document drafted by the conservative Spanish party Vox that describes hemispheric leftist organizations, such as the São Paulo Forum and the Puebla Group, as enemies of Ibero-America and accuses them of engaging in "a criminal project under the umbrella of the Cuban regime" that "seeks to destabilize liberal democracies and the state of law". In the 2021 Argentine legislative election, Villarruel was elected to the Argentine Chamber of Deputies, a position she maintained until 2023; she was an independent politician until she joined in 2022 the conservative Democratic Party. She was also the running mate of Javier Milei in the 2023 Argentine general election as part of the La Libertad Avanza coalition, and was elected vice president of Argentina.

During their presidential campaign, observers pointed to several differences between Villarruel and Milei. Villarruel supports civil unions but not same-sex marriage in Argentina, and disagrees with Milei on questions like organ trade legalization, on the grounds that the human body should not be treated as goods; their differences of views have been explained as philosophical issues due to Milei's economist background. They also held different views on the National Reorganization Process. While Milei publicly expressed that he is not a defender of it, Villarruel is the daughter of a military officer and has been accused by some of historical revisionism in her accounts of the period. Despite this, she had a significant influence on Milei during the campaign.

During a September 2023 debate, Villarruel was accused by Agustín Rossi, the vice-presidential candidate from the Union for the Homeland, of "infiltrating democracy", while the leftist vice-presidential candidate Nicolás del Caño from the Workers' Left Front asked Villarruel about her meetings with Videla and what they talked about, referencing the Etchecolatz case. In late August 2023, it was made public that Villarruel's name and mobile phone number were written down in handwriting by Miguel Etchecolatz, who was convicted of kidnapping and murder in the Night of the Pencils, in the diary where he was preparing the defence of his trial in 2006 for crimes against humanity. Referencing one of the military dictatorship's most infamous members, a former marine officer also known as "the Angel of Death", Rossi told Villarruel: "I think that, deep down, you vindicate the dictatorship. I've never heard you criticize the torture, the rapes, or the stealing of babies. You remind me of Astiz, you know how he infiltrated the Mothers of Plaza de Mayo organization?" In response to Rossi's claims that she does not believe in democracy, Villarruel said: "Not only do I believe in democracy, but I have also been calling for democracy to recognize the civilian victims of terrorism that were attacked by the armed organizations you are implicitly defending."

In a November 2023 debate between the vice-presidential candidates, Villarruel disputed the higher estimate of 30,000 killed or disappeared during the 1974-1983 Argentine Dirty War, and defended the role played in the illegal repression by Juan Daniel Amelong, an Argentine Army lieutenant colonel who has accumulated five convictions for crimes against humanity committed in Rosario, Santa Fe. Her statements attracted criticism not only from the human rights secretary Horacio Pietragalla Corti and Nobel Peace Prize winner Adolfo Pérez Esquivel but also from leaders of the centrist Juntos por el Cambio coalition, the Radical Civic Union deputy Mario Negri, and Pablo Avelluto, who criticized Patricia Bullrich for having praised Villarruel's performance in the debate.

== Vice-presidency ==
As Vice President, Villarruel has opposed plans by Javier Milei to deploy the Argentine military to intervene in domestic security operations, particularly in the context of increasing drug-related violence in Rosario, saying that "The role of the armed forces is not to fight civilians." Villarruel also opposed the Milei government's agreement with the United Kingdom over the Falkland Islands, describing it as "contrary to the interests of our nation". Following a complaint by the French Football Federation after racist chants by Argentinian football players against French player Kylian Mbappé, Villarruel stated, "No colonialist country is going to intimidate us because of a stadium chant nor for speaking truths that they do not want to admit."

Villaruel also found herself in conflict with Milei's fiscal austerity measures. In July 2025, after proposals opposed by Milei to increase pensions and disability allowances passed in the Senate, which is also headed by the Villaruel as vice president, Milei called her "stupid" and "a traitor" on social media. In response, Villaruel told him to "grow up". Since then, they have developed a strained and avoidant relationship.

== Political positions ==
Politically, Villlarruel has been described as a conservative and a right-wing nationalist. On social issues, she opposes abortion and euthanasia. While she is favorable to civil unions for same-sex couples, she opposes same-sex marriage. Villarruel's views on social issues are heavily influenced by her traditional Catholic faith, as she attends a church from the Society of Saint Pius X.

She has defended the National Reorganization Process, which, along with some of her views on the military junta period, have garnered criticism. Her questioning and downplaying of the death toll and human rights abuses of the Dirty War have drawn accusations of Argentine state terrorism denial. She has falsely claimed that guerillas were primarily responsible for the violence in Argentina in the junta period. Villaruel has criticized the journalist Miriam Lewin, a victim of the junta. Villaruel has referred to Lewin by the names "Penny" and "Polaca" which her captors used, and said that her incarceration at the Navy Petty-Officers School (ESMA) is proof she was involved in guerilla activities. Villarruel has advocated for the closure of the ESMA museum as well as other memorials commemorating the junta's victims, and has threatened to reopen criminal cases against former guerillas. Villarruel claimed that the Néstor and Cristina Kirchner administrations protected left-wing terrorists. She said: "For the past twelve years, the Kirchner governments have glorified the armed struggle of the guerrillas. In Argentina, if you don't support the guerrillas, people assume you support the dictatorship." As a result of her statements, critics accused her of trying to rewrite the history of the military dictatorship, whitewashing the junta, and red-tagging her political opponents.

== Personal life ==
Villarruel is a traditionalist Catholic, and attends the Tridentine Mass at the chapel of Our Lady Mediatrix of All Graces in Buenos Aires; the chapel is operated by the Society of Saint Pius X (SSPX), a traditionalist Catholic group which is not in full communion with the Holy See. According to Father Javier Olivera Ravasi, she is not a member of the SSPX, but attends such chapel because it is the only one offering the Tridentine Mass in the area, and she also attends the Mass of Paul VI elsewhere in the city.

In addition to her native Spanish, Villarruel is conversational in English and Japanese.

== Electoral history ==
=== Executive ===
Electoral history of Victoria Villarruel
Election	Office	List	Votes			Result	Ref.
Election	Office	List	Total	%	P.	Result	Ref.
2023 1-R	Vice President of Argentina	La Libertad Avanza	8,034,990	29.99%	2nd	→ Round 2	
2023 2-R	Vice President of Argentina	La Libertad Avanza	14,476,462	55.69%	1st	Elected	

=== Legislative ===
Electoral history of Victoria Villarruel
Election	Office	List	No.	District	Votes			Result	Ref.
Election	Office	List	No.	District	Total	%	P.	Result	Ref.
2021	National Deputy	La Libertad Avanza	2	City of Buenos Aires	313,808	17.04%	3rd (Note: Presented on an electoral list. The data shown represents the share of the vote the entire party/alliance received in that constituency.)	Elected	

== Publications ==
- Los llaman... jóvenes idealistas (They Call Them... Idealist Youth), 2010.
- Los otros muertos. Las víctimas civiles del terrorismo guerrillero de los 70 (The Other Dead: The Civilian Victims of Guerrilla Terrorism in the 1970s), 2014, co-written with Carlos Manfroni.

Party political offices
Party re-established	Democratic Party nominee for Vice President of Argentina; 2023	Most recent
New political alliance	La Libertad Avanza nominee for Vice President of Argentina; 2023	Most recent
Political offices
Preceded by Cristina Fernández de Kirchner	Vice President of Argentina; 2023–present	Incumbent
