= Commander-in-Chief of the Navy =

Commander-in-Chief of the Navy may refer to:

- Commander-in-Chief of the Argentine Navy
- Commander-in-Chief of the Chilean Navy
- Commander-in-Chief, China (Royal Navy)
- Commander-in-Chief of the Indian Navy
- Commander-in-Chief of the Pakistan Navy
- Commander-in-Chief of the Russian Navy
- Commander-in-Chief, Africa (Royal Navy)
- Commander-in-chief of the Royal Thai Navy
