= Srur =

Srur is a surname. Notable people with the surname include:

- Idan Srur (born 1986), Israeli footballer
- Marcelo Srur (born 1957), admiral in the Argentine Navy
