= Denial of state terrorism in Argentina =

Denial of terrorism by the military in the Dirty War

The denialism of state terrorism during the civic-military dictatorship from 1976 to 1983 called the National Reorganization Process, which was part of the Dirty War, has taken different forms over time. They have included denying the existence of missing persons, the justification of the acts committed, and "equat[ing] the crimes of victims and perpetrators in order to ensure 'symmetrical treatment'" by use of the theory of the two demons.

== Modalities of negationism ==
Denialist expressions manifest themselves in various scenarios, which vary depending on the people involved and the means of communication used, among other factors. There are various modalities of denialism, those that range from the simple denial of facts to more subtle mechanisms, with sophisticated approaches to rationalization, relativisation and trivialization. At first, the central idea of the deniers was to reject the existence of human rights violations in the country and the attempt to compare it with other violent experiences as a way of reducing the events to the general context of violence in the country in the 20th century.

The main argument of the deniers is that in the 1970s and 1980s there was a Dirty War in the country between the Armed Forces of the Argentine Republic and these they regarded as "subversive elements", who the regime de facto categorized as armed organizations and anyone who opposed it. Proponents of denialism often link Videla's rule to the ideals of Western and Christian society, portraying guerrilla groups as opponents to these values. Another issue is the questioning of the number of victims. The debate about the number of disappeared people during the last Argentine dictatorship was very arduous and continues. In the case of state terrorism, question the figure of 30,000 missing detainees, arguing the number of files of missing persons collected by the National Commission on the Disappearance of Persons (CONADEP) in 1985, plus those added later, approximately 8,900, can be read as a form of denialism.

== Denial of state terrorism in history ==
=== During the military dictatorship ===
As in other cases of state terrorism, the National Reorganization Process planned crimes against humanity with the intention of installing these denialist discourses in the post-genocide, which is why clandestine detention and torture centres were used. Already in 1977, Jorge Rafael Videla, the then de facto president of Argentina, stated that "in every war there are people who survive, others who are incapacitated, others who die and others who disappear. Argentina is ending this war and, consequently, must be prepared to face its consequences. The disappearance of some people is an unintended consequence of this war." In 1979, he would deepen that idea to "Neither dead nor alive... he is missing."

=== 1980s ===
After Videla was convicted of crimes against humanity, he would recognize the intention to hide the crimes, stating: "You couldn't be shot. Take a number, say five thousand. Argentine society, changing, treacherous, would not have tolerated the executions: yesterday two in Buenos Aires, today six in Córdoba, tomorrow four in Rosario, and so on up to 5,000, 10,000, 30,000. There was no other way. They had to disappear." The final document of the military junta on the war against subversion and terrorism set the tone of denialism against state terrorism. It stated:

"... [M]any of the disappearances are a consequence of the way terrorists operate. They change their real names and surnames, they know each other by what they call 'nom de guerre' and they have abundant forged personal documentation. They are linked to what is called the 'passage into hiding'; those who decide to join terrorist organizations do so surreptitiously, abandoning their family, work and social environment. It is the most typical case: relatives report a disappearance whose cause is not explained or, knowing the cause, they do not want to explain it."

— Final document of the military junta on the war against subversion and terrorism

In this way, the military junta itself denied its responsibility for the crimes committed. A "Never Again" report from the National Commission on the Disappearance of Persons compiled data from thousands of reports of missing detainees. According to Hugo Vezzetti, it presented the victims as "hypervictims", allegedly silencing the political belonging of the survivors and witnesses. In this way, the testimonies that claimed and assumed "their past as revolutionary militants" were excluded. Thus, these "victims in their purest form, who showed their most innocent side: children, adolescents, nuns, pregnant women...were better suited to the collective mood", and were better accepted by broader society. Even the lawyers of the military personnel on trial emphasized the political belonging of the witnesses but in such a way that for many their interrogation resembled those that political prisoners were subjected to in torture sessions. This exclusion showed a clear direction of the testimony with the purpose of refuting the theory of the two demons, which maintained that there was a war where the ends justified the means, that is, that the military defended its Dirty War through a supposed and improbable equalization of forces with the enemy.

=== 1990s ===
The first act of denialism in a reduced sense was the book by former Buenos Aires police officer, later sentenced to life imprisonment for multiple crimes against humanity, Miguel Etchecolatz, The Other Camper of Never Again, where he stated that the CONADEP report was a lie. In the framework of the trials against those responsible for crimes against humanity, federal judge Daniel Rafecas stated that denialist speeches are "inherent to genocidal processes", and warned that such speeches seek impunity for the repressors in the exhibition "Genocide and Negationism: Disputes in the Construction of Memory", which he shared with sociologist Daniel Feierstein at the National University of La Plata (UNLP). Rafecas investigated the Megacause of the First Army Corps, and stated: "The implementation of clandestine detention centers has to do with the preparation of subsequent impunity: they were hidden, hidden. The form of mass extermination such as death flights are part of this idea of hiding. And all this was crowned by Videla's press conference in which he outlined this denialist theory before foreign journalists."

=== 2010s ===
In 2016, Darío Lopérfido, the then Minister of Culture of the City of Buenos Aires, denied that the number of victims was 30,000. Juan José Gómez Centurión, the general director of the National Customs Directorate, stated that the number of missing people was less than 30,000, denying the existence of a systematic genocidal plan.

In 2017, a group of more than 1,500 academics, researchers, and members of different public universities issued a statement rejecting the statements of some government officials about the last military dictatorship, stating that they were part of a strategy aimed at relativizing crime and normalizing that historical experience, in order to dilute its specificity and thereby hide the criminal, political, and judicial responsibilities of its promoters, executors, and accomplices. Among other actions aimed at making denialism prevail, they pointed to the total or partial dismantling of areas that investigated corporate responsibilities in dictatorial crimes and that provided evidence to the trials and/or assisted the victims, such as the Special Documentary Survey Group, the Survey and Analysis Teams of the Archives of the Armed Forces, the Truth and Justice Program, the Dr. Fernando Ulloa Center for Assistance to Victims of Human Rights Violations, the Sub-Management for the Promotion of Human Rights of the Central Bank, the assignment of military personnel to direct the National Witness Protection Program. These actions have gone hand in hand with the limitation of programs aimed at disseminating and reflecting on state terrorism in educational institutions and civil society, such as the Education and Memory Program of the Ministry of Education of the Nation, the National Network of Education and Memory, and the various provincial programs that were part of it. Criminal law expert Valeria Thus defined these expressions as a potential denialism, which could be related to actions tending to establish impunity. About the way Macri answered the question of how many people had been murdered, she described it as "the first time that denialist rhetoric has entered general political discourse".

=== 2020s ===
In 2023, the journalist and former military officer José D'Angelo published his book The Scam with the Disappeared, where he describes cases of supposed false victims of the last dictatorship and criticizes the lack of transparency in the payment of compensation granted by the state. The book was going to be presented at the Library of Congress by Alberto Asseff; the presentation was canceled due to the controversy that arose. That same year, the former minister and then current presidential candidate Patricia Bullrich responded in an interview to the question of whether or not the number of missing people should be discussed by saying that "what we cannot say is 'either you say 30 thousand or you are a traitor to the country'... let's see... the basis is the freedom (to express an opinion)." This comment was also accused of being denialist. In the political coalition La Libertad Avanza, the statements of the deputy and then presidential candidate Javier Milei also attracted controversy. Milei referred to the victims of state terrorism as "terrorists who were causing disasters and who did not fight according to military rules but instead fought 'dirty'." Milei's vice-presidential candidate Victoria Villarruel referred to the ESMA Memory Site Museum, the largest clandestine detention center that operated in the city of Buenos Aires, as the museum of "lack of memory", a place where "only half of the story is told".

== See also ==
- Montoneros
- Clandestine detention center (Argentina)
- People's Revolutionary Army (Argentina)
- Disappeared Detainees of the Dirty War
