= Nordseewerke =

Shipbuilding company in Emden, Germany

Nordseewerke Emden GmbH
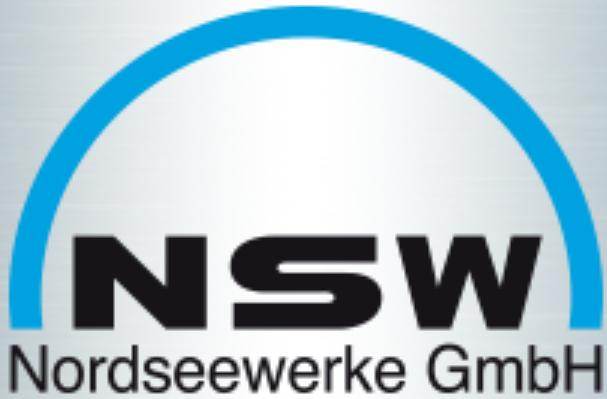
- Company type: Private
- Industry: Shipbuilding
- Genre: Shipbuilding
- Founded: 1903
- Defunct: 2010, successor Schaaf Industrie AG (SIAG)
- Headquarters: Emden, Germany
- Number of employees: 1400 (in 2010)
- Parent: Fosen Yard (Norway)
- Website: www.nordseewerke.de

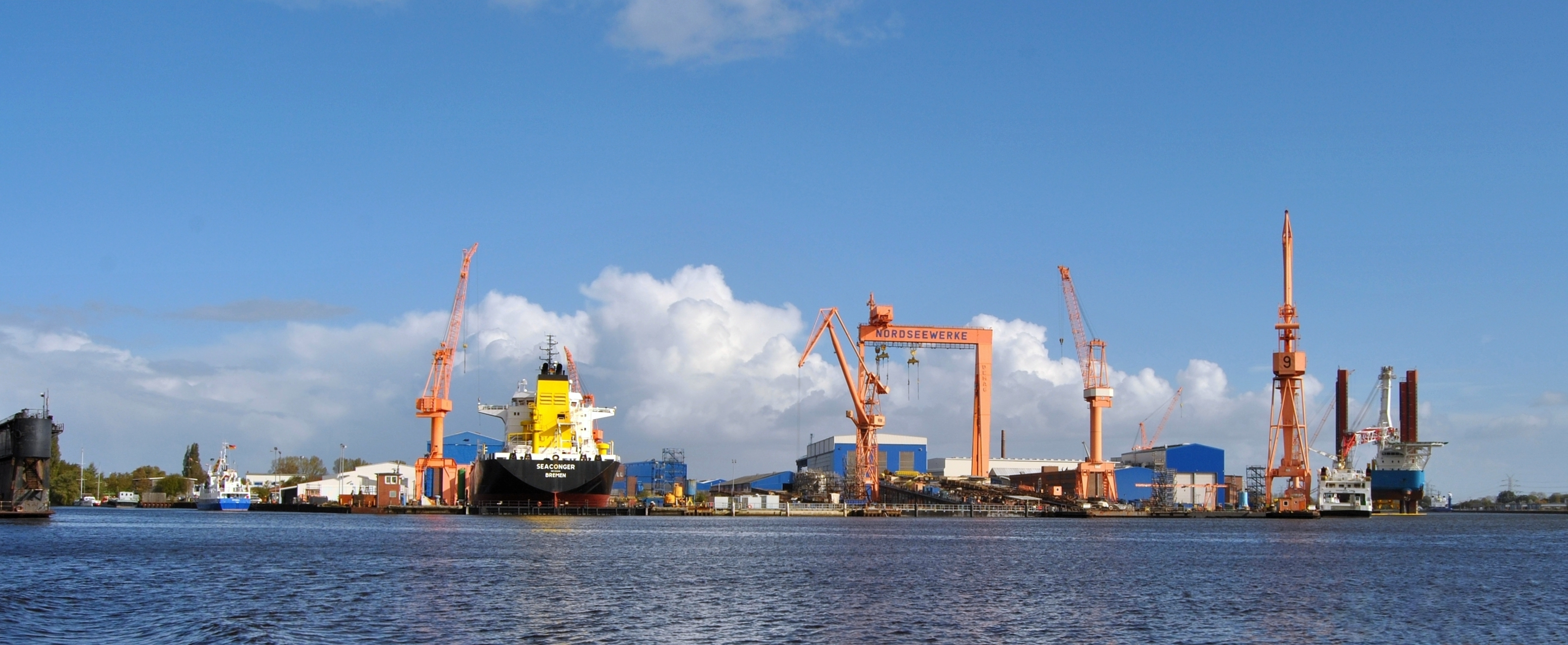
Nordseewerke with the inland port of Emden in the foreground seen from the southwest in 2010

Nordseewerke Emden GmbH (sometimes abbreviated NSWE, in English: North Sea Company) was a shipbuilding company, located in the Emden Harbor of the north German city of Emden. Founded in 1903, shipbuilding ended in 2010, and the company was taken over by the Schaaf Industrie AG, which among other products, makes components for off-shore systems.

The shipyard employed some 1,400 people in 2010 and was the second-largest employer in Emden, following the plant of the Volkswagen automotive company. Today only few of the former coworkers of the shipyard are still employed with the new owner Schaaf, which also went insolvent in 2012.

== History ==
Nordseewerke was founded on March 11, 1903, and was one of the oldest among the still-existing shipyards in Germany. Its successor was the Schaaf Industrie AG. The company built merchant ships of all categories, but also ships for the Kaiserliche Marine during World War I, the Kriegsmarine later, and today's modern Deutsche Marine.

The shipyard has also constructed ships for use by other navies, such as the Kobben (Type 207) and Ula (Klasse 210)-class submarines for the Royal Norwegian Navy, which were built to operate in shallow, coastal waters. In the past 20 years, submarines were also exported to South Africa, Argentina (TR-1700-class submarine), and Israel.

Besides container and other freight-carrying ships, Nordseewerke also built naval vessels. In 1971, the cruise liner Sea Venture (later renamed the Pacific Princess) was constructed. The ship is well known as the film location of The Love Boat.

=== Submarines (U-boats) ===
- Type 207 submarines
- Type 1700 submarines
- Type 210 submarines

Ships built by Nordseewerke (selection)

- 1915–1916, first construction of minesweepers for Kaiserliche Marine (M13 and M14)
- 1915–1917, construction of 10 fishing vessels (among them Geier, Bielefeld, Münster), all used as outpost-ships during World War I
- 1920, 14,000 t tanker Baltic for the Deutsch-Amerikanische Petroleum AG (DAPG), largest ship built by NSWE at that time
- 1922, construction of a floating dock for Argentina
- 1931, ore-transport ship Odin for Seereederei „Frigga“ of Hamburg
- 1931, 17,500 t tanker J. H. Senior for the Baltisch Amerikanische Petroleum Import GmbH in Danzig
- 1935–1939, five 6,000 GRT cargo ships: yard number 176 Widar; 186 Bragge; and 192 Vale; all for Seereederei „Frigga“, and yard number 188 Sabine Howaldt; and 189 Klaus Howaldt; both for Bernhard Howaldt
- 1940–1944, delivery of 30 submarines of type VII C (U-331 to U-350 and U-1101 to U-1110); additional submarine orders were cancelled
- 1973, Four container-carrier SeaTrain in US with gas-turbine propulsion, worldwide fastest merchant ships at that time
- 1976, yard no. 399, cargo ship Aegir for Seereederei „Frigga“. Altogether NSWE built 23 ships for this company between 1921 and 1968.
- 1977, yard no. 455, combined ore-bulk-oil carrier Saggat for a Swedish company
- 1978/1979, yard nos. 463 and 465, TR-1700-class submarines Santa Cruz and San Juan for the Argentine Navy
- 1979, BACO-LINER 1, a new developed concept barge/container-ship (BACO = BArges und COntainer); followed BACO-LINER 2 and BACO-LINER 3
- 1983, yard no. 464, F 122 Bremen-class frigate Emden; followed 1990 frigate Lübeck
- 1986, reconstruction of the Soviet icebreaker Mudyug with new technology (among them Thyssen-Waas Bow and Air Bubble System); followed icebreaker Kapitan Sorokin
- 1994–1996, yard no. 469, F 123 Brandenburg-class frigate Bayern for the German Navy
- 1999, yard no. 525, suction dredge Vasco da Gama for Belgium Jan de Nul Offshore-Company, worldwide greatest suction dredge at that time
- 1999, Dolphin-class submarine Dolphin for the Israeli Navy; altogether 3 units of this class were built at NSWE (Dolphin, Leviathan and Tekumah)
- 2001, yard no. 521, F 124 Sachsen-class frigate Hessen in cooperation with Blohm+Voss and HDW (ARGE F 124) for the German Navy
- December 2009, launching of container carrier Frisia Cottbus, last ship of NSWE
