= List of ships named ARA Rivadavia =

At least two ships of the Argentine Navy have been named ARA Rivadavia:

- The first Rivadavia was launched in 1902 but sold to Japan while still incomplete at the end of the Argentine–Chilean naval arms race, where it was renamed Kasuga. It was sunk in 1945.
- ARA Rivadavia, the lead ship of its class, was launched in 1911 and scrapped in 1957.
- ARA Rivadavia (D-14), a cancelled Almirante Brown-class destroyer

In addition at least two ships of the Argentine Navy has been named ARA Comodoro Rivadavia:

- ARA Comodoro Rivadavia (1937), a survey vessel commissioned in 1928 as San Juan she was renamed Comodoro Riavdavia in 1937 and Madryn in 1942. She was sold in 1967.
- ARA Comodoro Rivadavia (Q-11), a survey ship commissioned in 1974.
