= TR-1700-class submarine =

Argentine submarine class

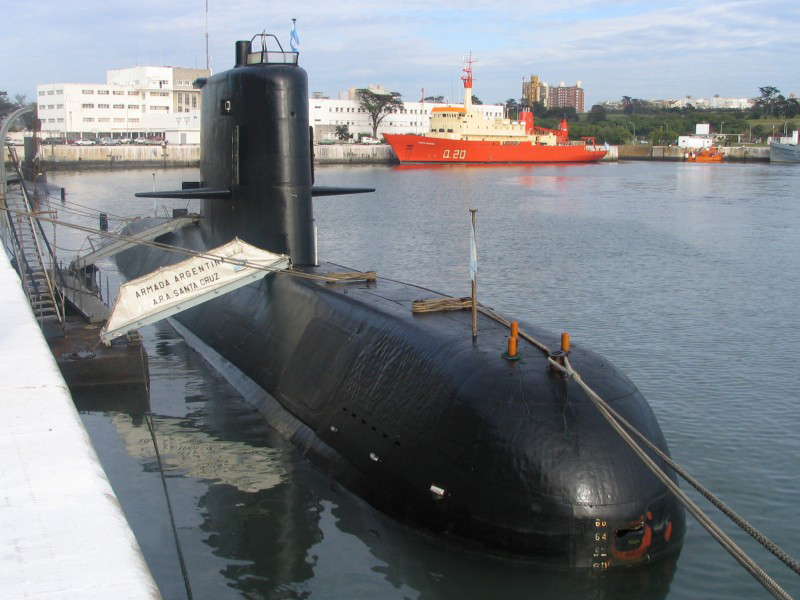
- TR-1700 submarine ARA Santa Cruz (S-41) at Base Naval Mar del Plata.

Class overview
- Builders: Thyssen Nordseewerke, Emden, Germany; Astillero Domecq Garcia, Argentina
- Operators: Argentine Navy
- In commission: 1984–2020
- Planned: 6
- Completed: 2
- Canceled: 4
- Active: 0
- Laid up: 1
- Lost: 1

General characteristics
- Type: Submarine
- Displacement: 2116 tonnes (Surfaced); 2264 tonnes (Submerged)
- Length: 67.30 m (220 ft 10 in)
- Beam: 8.36 m (27 ft 5 in)
- Draught: 6.5 m (21 ft 4 in)
- Propulsion: 1 shaft (5 blades); 4 × MTU 16V652 MB80 diesel engines; 1 × Siemens electric motor; 8 × 120-cell banks of VARTA batteries
- Speed: 15 knots (28 km/h; 17 mph) surfaced; 25 knots (46 km/h; 29 mph) submerged
- Range: 12,000 nmi (22,000 km; 14,000 mi) at 8 kn (15 km/h; 9.2 mph) surfaced
- Endurance: 30 days
- Test depth: 300 m (980 ft)
- Complement: 26
- Sensors & processing systems: Radars: Thomson-CSF Calypso; Sonar Systems: Atlas Elektronik CSU 3/4; Thompson Sintra DUUX-5; Fire-control system: HSA SINBADS
- Armament: 6 × 533 mm (21 in) bow torpedo tubes; 22 torpedoes; Mines

The TR-1700 (Santa Cruz) is a class of diesel-electric patrol submarines built by Thyssen Nordseewerke for the Argentine Navy in the 1980s, with two submarines completed. These boats are amongst the largest submarines built in Germany since World War II and are among the fastest diesel-electric submarines in the world. ARA San Juan was lost on 17 November 2017, leaving ARA Santa Cruz as the only remaining submarine of this class. As of 2020, the refit of Santa Cruz has been reported cancelled leaving the entire class inactive.

== Development ==
The original 1977 plan called for six boats, two TR-1700s built in Germany by Thyssen Nordseewerke, two in Argentina by Astillero Domecq Garcia, and two smaller TR-1400s also built in Argentina. The final agreement in 1982 was modified to six TR-1700s, with the last four to be built in Argentina. The first of these vehicles entered service in 1984.

=== Possible nuclear propulsion ===
The TR-1700s to be built in Argentina were considered for an upgrade to a nuclear submarine. The use of INVAP's CAREM reactor for that purpose is an 'urban myth,' as such design is inadequate for moving platforms. The nuclear submarine project never came to fruition, despite later attempts to revive it.

The reasons why INVAP's reactor is inviable stem from a number of reasons. The main reasons are:

- The reactor was not designed from scratch for moving platforms and relies on the naïve and dangerous concept of "one reactor fits all purposes".
- The design has not considered the dynamic and operational characteristics of the porting platform. This causes problems in the following areas:
  - Thermal problems due to the large diameter of the pellets (7.6mm), which do not allow sudden power ramps, required in a submarine.
  - Wrong type of control rod mechanisms, not adequate for a rolling and pitching vessel. For example, nut-shell control rods would be more appropriate.
  - The continuous movement of the large liquid free-surface inside the reactor, as experienced in vessels of any type (surface or submerged), leave fuel unexposed and, thus, not refrigerated.
  - Steam generators located inside the reactor vessel (instead of outside) increase the diameter of the vessel and thus its weight, unnecessarily, restricting the operational characteristics of the submarine.
  - Inconvenient coupling of various variables due to auto-pressurization.
  - Lack of land prototype on a moving platform (not static). See figure to the right for a Westinghouse prototype for submarines.
  - Numerical simulations for untested designs are not enough, and are only the first step in a series of validations that have to agree with actual experiments. Before offering a reactor as a proposal, any contractor—at their own expense—should perform experiments on moving platforms (water tanks excited to reproduce ship movements) located on land, and demonstrate that they work and agree with the numerical simulations. The reactor should be identical to the reactor proposed to be fitted in a ship or submarine.

== Design ==
The TR-1700 submarine was designed by Thyssen and its features include high underwater speed, endurance (for a diesel submarine), and survivability. The boat's four MTU 16V652 MB80 diesel engines, four generators, and Siemens electric motor can propel it at speeds up to 25 knots (46 km/h; 29 mph). Eight 120-cell banks of VARTA batteries are installed on each boat. They have a diving depth of 300 m (980 ft). Normal endurance of these boats is 30 days with an extended range up to 70 days. These boats are equipped to accept a Deep Submergence Rescue Vehicle (DSRV). Armaments include six bow 533 mm (21 in) torpedo tubes and space for 22 torpedoes. The TR-1700 can launch a variety of weapons via its torpedo tubes, such as the wire-guided SST-4 torpedo and the Mark 37C short antisubmarine torpedo. The automatic torpedo reload system can reload sixteen times and reloading the tubes takes 50 seconds.

When it comes to the electronics and systems the TR-1700 has a HSA SINBADS Action Information Organisation and Fire Control System that is combined with a SAGEM plotting table. The radar consists of the Thomson-CSF Calypso and it has an Atlas Elektronik CSU 3/4 and Thomson Sintra DUUX-5 as sonars.

Thyssen proposed the TR1700A for the Australian Collins-class submarine program. The proposed design had a reworked pressure hull, was six meters longer, and half a meter wider than the TR-1700s built for Argentina. It lost to the Type 471 from Kockums, an enlarged Västergötland-class submarine.

== Service ==
The first two submarines were delivered on schedule in 1984–85. The remaining four built in Argentina were suspended due to the Argentinean economic crisis of the 1980s. In 1996 work completely ceased on ARA Santa Fe at 70% (or 52%) completion while ARA Santiago del Estero was only 30% complete. After attempts to complete and sell the boats to Taiwan failed, they were cannibalized, along with the parts for the fifth and sixth units, to support the continued operations of the first two submarines.

Santa Cruz received its mid-life modernization at Arsenal de Marinha, Rio de Janeiro Brazil between September 1999 and 2001. The work involved the replacement of the engines, batteries, and sonar. Her sister boat San Juan entered the Astillero Domecq Garcia shipyard to receive her refit in 2007; she completed refit in 2013.

In September 2010, it was revealed that the Ministry of Defense was conducting feasibility studies to decide if ARA Santa Fe (S-43) should be completed. The decision should be made sometime after completing the mid-life modernization of ARA San Juan (S-42). The estimated cost of completing Santa Fe was $60 million.

On 17 November 2017, the ARA San Juan was reported missing; reports of a fire at the time were denied by the Argentine Navy. A year after that, on 17 November 2018, private company Ocean Infinity (appointed by the Argentine Government) announced that they successfully located the wreck, at 900 metres depth and 500 km from Comodoro Rivadavia.

== Boats in class ==
TR-1700 class construction data
Vessel Name	Pennant number	Builder	Completed	Status
ARA Santa Cruz	S-41	Thyssen Nordseewerke	18 October 1984	Inactive; envisaged refit cancelled as of 2020.
ARA San Juan	S-42	Thyssen Nordseewerke	19 November 1985	Formerly in service with Argentine Navy. Confirmed lost on 23 November 2017; wreck found in Atlantic Ocean on 16 November 2018. Recovery by American team pending naval decision.
ARA Santa Fe	S-43	Astillero Domecq Garcia		Construction suspended - 70% (or 52%) complete Boat could be completed after feasibility studies. Unknown if sub was cannibalized for parts along with the rest of incomplete members of the class.
ARA Santiago Del Estero	S-44	Astillero Domecq Garcia		Construction suspended - 30% complete and eventually cannibalized for spare parts for active subs.
(none)	S-45	Astillero Domecq Garcia		Construction suspended - Little complete Components cannibalized for spares
(none)	S-46	Astillero Domecq Garcia		Suspended; Components cannibalized for spares

== Gallery ==
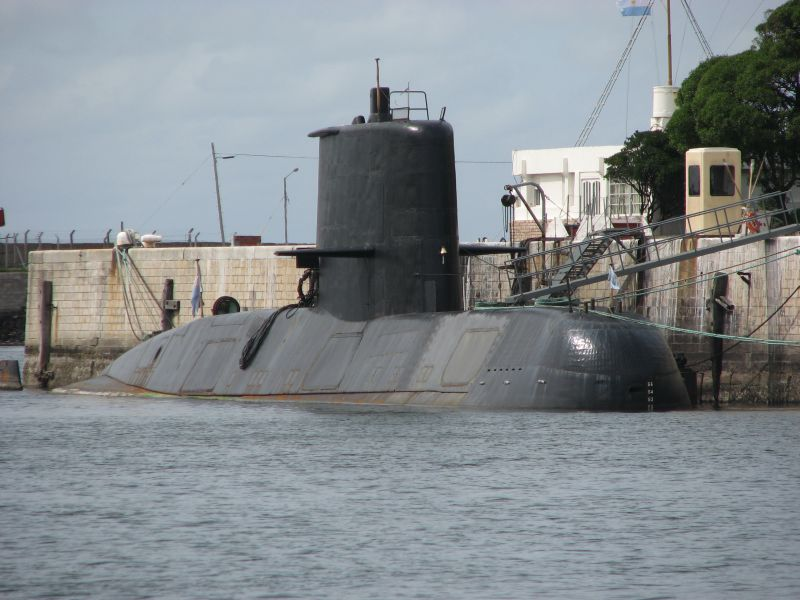
Argentine Navy ARA San Juan in 2007

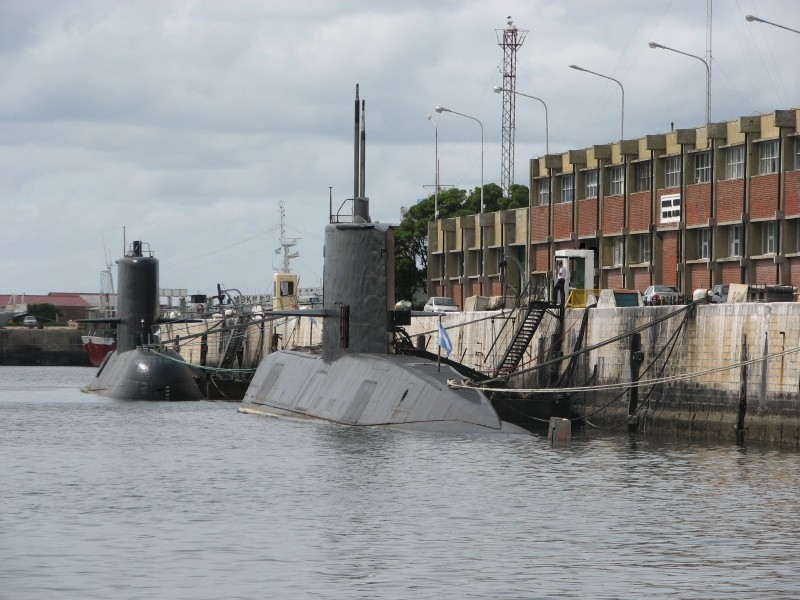
Argentine Navy TR-1700 submarines ARA Santa Cruz (S-41) and ARA San Juan (S-42)

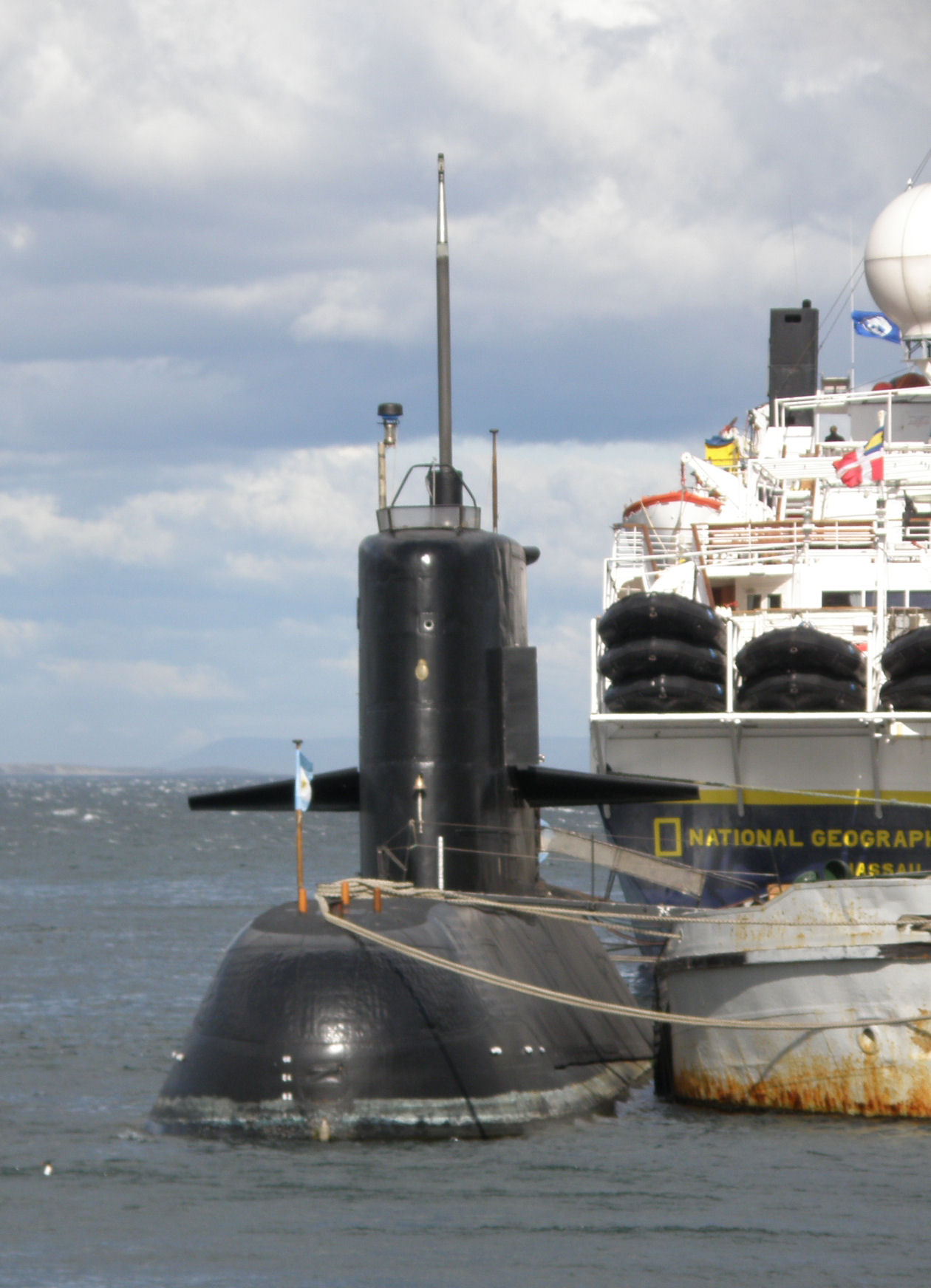
ARA Santa Cruz in Ushuaia, 2008

== See also ==
- List of submarine classes in service

Equivalent submarines of the same era

- Harushio class
- Sindhughosh class
- Hai Lung class
- Kilo class
- Upholder/Victoria class

== Notes ==
=== Sources ===
- Darman, Peter, ed. (2004). Twenty-first Century Submarines and Warships. Military Handbooks. Rochester: Grange Books. ISBN 1-84013-678-2.
- Gardiner, Robert; Chumbley, Stephen; Budzbon, Przemysław, eds. (1995). Conway's All the World's Fighting Ships 1947–1995. Annapolis: Naval Institute Press. ISBN 1-55750-132-7.
- Miller, David; Jordan, John (1987). Modern Submarine Warfare. New York: Military Press. ISBN 0-517-64647-1.
- Miller, David (1989). Modern Submarines. Combat Arms. New York: Prentice Hall Press. ISBN 0-13-589102-7.
