= ARA Santa Cruz (S-41) =

1982 TR-1700-class submarine

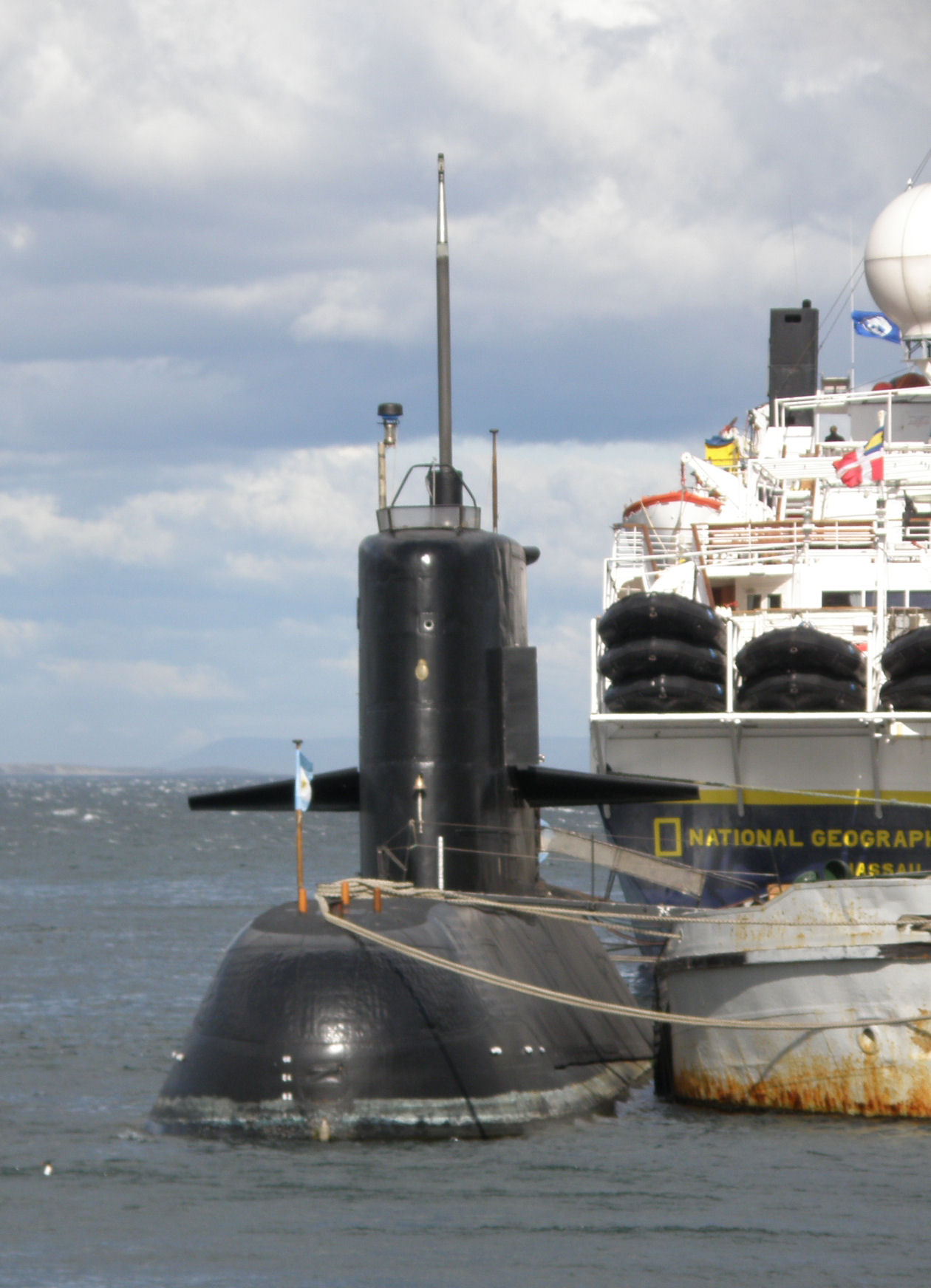
- TR-1700 submarine ARA Santa Cruz in Ushuaia

History

Argentina
- Name: ARA Santa Cruz
- Builder: Thyssen Nordseewerke, Emden, Germany
- Yard number: 463
- Launched: 28 September 1982
- Commissioned: 12 October 1984
- Status: Laid up

General characteristics
- Class & type: TR-1700-class submarine
- Displacement: 2116 tonnes (surfaced); 2264 tonnes (submerged)
- Length: 66 m (217 ft)
- Beam: 7.3 m (24 ft)
- Draught: 6.5 m (21 ft)
- Propulsion: 1 shaft 4 × MTU diesels; 1 × Siemens electric motor
- Speed: 15 knots (28 km/h) surfaced; 25 knots (46 km/h) submerged
- Range: 12,000 nmi (22,000 km) at 8 kn (15 km/h) surfaced
- Endurance: 30 days
- Complement: 26
- Sensors & processing systems: Radar: Thompson CSF Calypso; Sonar: Atlas Elektronik CSU 3/4, Thompson Sintra DUUX-5
- Armament: 6 × 533 mm (21 in) bow torpedo tubes; 22 torpedoes

ARA Santa Cruz (S-41) is a member of the TR-1700 class of diesel-electric submarines of the Argentine Navy.

== Design ==
Santa Cruz was built by Thyssen Nordseewerke. It has a single-hull design, with a lightweight bow and stern and a watertight superstructure in the central part. Its sister vessel, ARA San Juan was the only other one of its type, though the program originally sought to produce a larger number of submarines.

The TR-1700-class was designed for long-range operations in the South Atlantic, with a strong emphasis on high submerged speed, endurance, and deep-diving capability compared to earlier Argentine submarines.

Santa Cruz was equipped with diesel-electric propulsion, allowing extended submerged operations using battery power, and was considered among the fastest conventional submarines of its era when submerged.

Santa Cruz received its mid-life modernization at Arsenal de Marinha, Rio de Janeiro Brazil between September 1999 and 2001. The work involved the replacement of the engines, batteries, and sonar.

The modernization was intended to restore the submarine’s original performance levels and extend its operational life, enabling continued service into the 2010s.

== History ==
Santa Cruz was built by Thyssen Nordseewerke and completed on 18 October 1984.

Following commissioning, Santa Cruz entered service with the Argentine Navy’s Submarine Force and was based at Mar del Plata, the navy’s principal submarine base.

During the late Cold War period, the submarine participated in routine patrols, training deployments, and multinational naval exercises, contributing to Argentina’s undersea warfare capability in the South Atlantic.

Throughout the 1980s and 1990s, Santa Cruz was regarded as one of the most capable assets of the Argentine Navy, frequently used for crew training and operational readiness exercises.

On 15 June 2014, Santa Cruz ran aground in an accident near Buenos Aires. She was being towed to Tandanor shipyard for maintenance, and was unlocked without damage.

No injuries were reported as a result of the grounding, and the incident did not result in structural damage to the pressure hull.

=== Mid-life extension ===
In September 2016, Santa Cruz started a renovation and life extension program at the Tandanor shipyard in Buenos Aires, Argentina. The work was to include changing all 960 batteries, periscope and snorkel maintenance, revision of engines, and overall system upgrades.

The refit was intended to return Santa Cruz to operational service and extend her service life by approximately 10 to 15 years.

Renovation work was halted on 15 November 2017 when sister ship San Juan imploded and subsequently sunk, to determine whether the cause of the incident was due to a failure that could be repeated on Santa Cruz.

The suspension formed part of a wider safety review of the TR-1700-class conducted by the Argentine Navy following the loss of San Juan.

Work was restarted in February 2019, from where it was expected to take two years to return Santa Cruz to service in 2021. However, by the end of 2020 the refit of Santa Cruz had been reported cancelled leaving the navy without an operational submarine.

As a result of the cancellation, Santa Cruz remained laid up at Tandanor, marking the effective end of Argentina’s operational submarine capability at that time.

== See also ==
- List of ships of the Argentine Navy
