= ARA San Juan (S-42) =

Diesel electric attack submarine

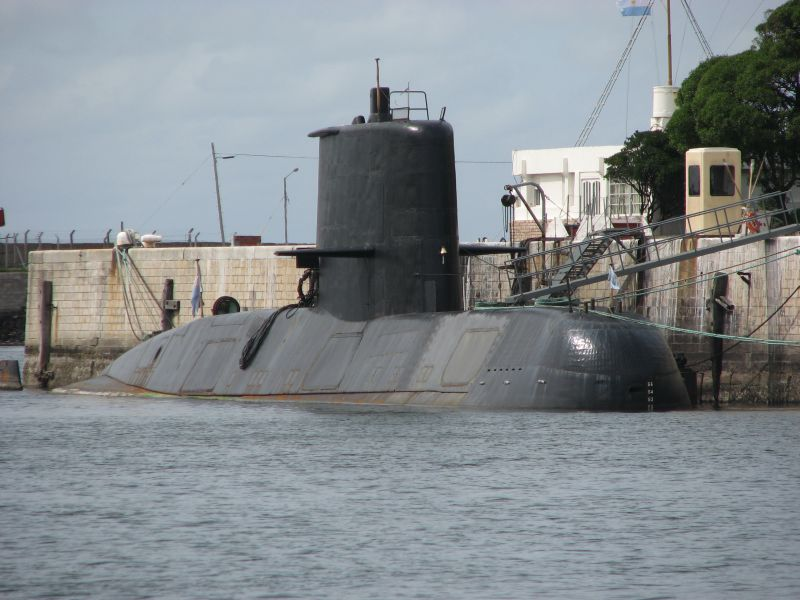
- ARA San Juan (S-42) in 2007

History

Argentina
- Name: San Juan
- Namesake: San Juan Province, Argentina
- Builder: Thyssen Nordseewerke, Emden, West Germany
- Yard number: 465
- Laid down: 18 March 1982
- Launched: 20 June 1983
- Completed: 19 November 1985
- Commissioned: 19 November 1985
- Out of service: 15 November 2017
- Refit: 2014
- Home port: Mar del Plata
- Identification: Pennant number S-42
- Fate: Imploded; Sunk in the Atlantic Ocean 15 November 2017 (with all hands)

General characteristics
- Class & type: TR-1700-class submarine
- Displacement: 2,140 tonnes (surfaced); 2,336 tonnes (submerged)
- Length: 67.30 m (220.8 ft)
- Beam: 8.36 m (27.4 ft)
- Draught: 7.34 m (24.1 ft)
- Propulsion: 1 shaft 4 × MTU diesels; 1 × Siemens electric motor
- Speed: 15 knots (28 km/h) surfaced; 25 knots (46 km/h) submerged
- Range: 12,000 nmi (22,000 km) at 8 kn (15 km/h) surfaced
- Endurance: 30 days
- Test depth: 300 m (980 ft)
- Complement: 37
- Sensors & processing systems: Radar Thomson-CSF Calypso; Sonar Atlas Elektronik CSU 3/4, Thomson Sintra DUUX-5
- Armament: 6 × 533 mm (21 in) bow torpedo tubes; 22 torpedoes

ARA San Juan (S-42) was a TR-1700-class diesel-electric submarine in service with the Submarine Force of the Argentine Navy from 1985 to 2017. It was built in West Germany, entering service on 19 November 1985, and underwent a mid-life update from 2008 to 2013.

On 15 November 2017, San Juan went missing with 44 crewmen during a routine patrol in the South Atlantic off Patagonia. She was believed to have suffered an electrical malfunction, and a multi-nation search operation was mounted. Within hours of San Juan's last transmission, an acoustic anomaly consistent with an implosion was detected in the vicinity of the vessel's last known location. When the submarine was not located for a week, the crew were presumed dead by the Argentine government. On 30 November, the search and rescue operation was abandoned.

The Argentine Navy reported on 16 November 2018 that the wreck of San Juan had been found at a depth of 907 metres (2,976 ft), 460 kilometres (290 mi) southeast of Comodoro Rivadavia. The submarine's imploded wreckage was strewn over an area of 8,000 square metres (86,000 ft^{2}).

== Design ==
Built by Thyssen Nordseewerke, San Juan was laid down on 18 March 1982 and launched on 20 June 1983. It had a single-hull design, with a lightweight bow and stern and a watertight superstructure in the central part. Its sister vessel, ARA Santa Cruz, is the only other one of its type, though the program originally sought to produce a larger number of submarines.

== Name ==
The submarine's name derives from the province of San Juan; the names of all Argentine submarines begin with the letter S. Past ships with the same name are a destroyer (1911), a surveyor (1929), and a torpedo boat (1937).

The prefix ARA is the acronym of the Argentine Navy in Spanish (Spanish: Armada de la República Argentina).

== Operational history ==
The submarine entered service on 18 November 1985.

In 1994, during the FleetEx 2/94 "George Washington" exercise with the United States Navy, San Juan avoided detection by United States anti-submarine forces for the entire duration of the war game, penetrating the destroyer defense and "sinking" the command ship USS Mount Whitney. The submarine took part in other exercises including Gringo-Gaucho and UNITAS.

The vessel underwent a mid-life update between 2008 and 2013, taking longer than expected due to budget constraints. The upgrade cost around 100 million pesos (US$12.4 million) and comprised more than 500,000 work hours during which the submarine was cut in half and had its four MTU engines and batteries replaced. Shortly before the refit, the submarine had been equipped with a portable navigation radar, communication equipment, and a Garmin GPSMAP 5012 plotter. The updates were carried out at the Argentine Industrial Naval Complex's (CINAR) Tandanor and Storni shipyards, in the southern sector of Buenos Aires port. Later, San Juan was tasked with carrying out surveillance exercises in the exclusive economic zone around Puerto Madryn, particularly in the role of combating illegal fishing.

== Disappearance ==
Location of the wreck

On 17 November 2017, it was announced that San Juan had not been heard from since 15 November when the vessel was 430 kilometres (270 mi) from the coast, off San Jorge Gulf on its way to Mar del Plata from Ushuaia following a military exercise, and that a search and rescue operation had been launched in the same area. There were 44 sailors on board the missing submarine, including Argentina's first female submarine officer, Eliana Krawczyk. The submarine carried oxygen for no more than seven days when submerged.

=== Search ===
The search and rescue operation was carried out under the auspices of the International Submarine Escape and Rescue Liaison Office, an organisation of over 40 countries set up in 2003 following the Kursk submarine disaster. The search area was 482,507 square kilometres (186,297 sq mi) in size and weather conditions throughout the search and rescue period changed, making the task far more difficult on days with large waves and high winds. Search efforts continued several days, without success.

The director-general of the Vienna-based UN International Atomic Energy Agency IAEA Rafael Grossi, an Argentinian national, proposed the use of the international hydrophones network, owned by the Preparatory Commission for the Comprehensive Nuclear-Test-Ban Treaty Organization, also based in Vienna, to seek information about the vessel's fate. He convinced Lassina Zerbo, CTBTO executive director, to search the organization's records for anomalies. On 23 November the Argentine Navy said an event consistent with an implosion had been detected at 46.12°S 59.69°W by the CTBTO listening posts on Ascension Island (HA10) and Crozet Islands (HA04), and records matched with the day the submarine stopped communicating.

By 24 November, the search and rescue operation involved more than 30 aircraft and ships from Argentina, the United Kingdom (arctic patrol), Brazil, the United States, Chile, and other countries. More than 4,000 personnel from 13 countries assisted in the search, scouring an area the size of Spain.

On 27 November, a press release revealed that according to the submarine's last report from 15 November, San Juan's snorkel had leaked water into the forward storage batteries the day before, which ignited a fire. After extinguishing the fire, the crew disconnected the forward batteries. The submarine continued onward, powered by the aft batteries.

On 30 November, 15 days after San Juan went missing, the Navy declared that the rescue phase of the operation was over, and the search for the submarine on the seabed would continue. The loss of 44 crewmen constituted the largest loss of life aboard a submarine since the Chinese submarine 361 malfunctioned in April 2003, until being surpassed by the loss of 53 crewmen aboard the Indonesian submarine KRI Nanggala in April 2021. A criminal investigation was launched into the disappearance.

=== Wreck discovery ===
On 16 November 2018, the remains of ARA San Juan were found at a depth of 907 metres (2,976 ft), at 45°56′59″S 59°46′22″W (20 km or 12 mi NNW from the seismic anomaly previously reported by the CTBTO) and nearly 270 nautical miles (500 km; 310 mi) from Comodoro Rivadavia, by a remote submersible operated by the Norwegian ship Seabed Constructor of the company Ocean Infinity, a private maritime company hired by the Argentine government.

It had been considered that the probability of locating the wreck in the area where it was eventually found was 90%, but previous searches failed to find it due to insufficient technology and presence of numerous submarine canyons. A "hydro-acoustic anomaly" consistent with an implosion had been detected 30 nautical miles (56 km; 35 mi) north of the submarine's last known position at 10:31 ART (13:31 UTC) on 15 November 2017. Photographs showed the shattered remains of the submarine broken up on the seabed. Ocean Infinity will receive a reward of US$7.5 million for finding the missing vessel. Argentine Navy spokesman Captain Jorge Balbi presented close-up photos of the wreck in a press briefing. The pictures show the imploded pressure hull, with the bow section, sail and propellers scattered in a 100-metre (330 ft) diameter area of 8,000 square metres (86,000 ft^{2}).

== Commemoration ==
On 24 October 2021 a memorial commemorating the 44 crew members lost was unveiled in front of the Mar del Plata Naval Base.

== See also ==
- List of ships of the Argentine Navy
- List of submarines of Submarine Force Command
- List of submarine incidents since 2000
