= Julio Guardia =

Argentine navy officer

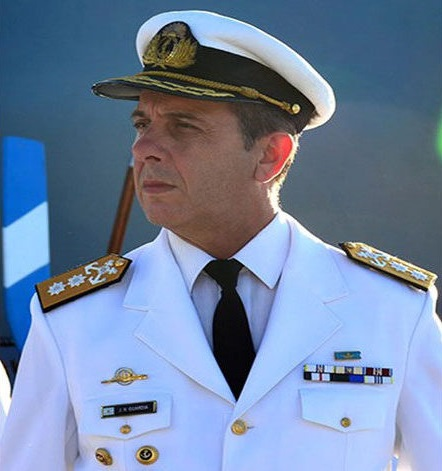

Chief of the General Staff of the Argentine Navy
- In office 28 February 2020 – 2 January 2024
- Preceded by: José Luis Villán
- Succeeded by: Carlos María Allievi

Personal details
- Born: 14 December 1962 (age 63) Buenos Aires, Argentina

Military service
- Allegiance: Argentina
- Branch/service: Argentine Navy
- Years of service: 1981-2024
- Rank: Admiral

Julio Horacio Guardia (born 14 December 1962) is a retired Argentine Admiral, that served as the Chief of the General Staff of the Argentine Navy.

He graduated from the Naval Academy in 1985.
