= Marcelo Srur =

Argentine Navy officer

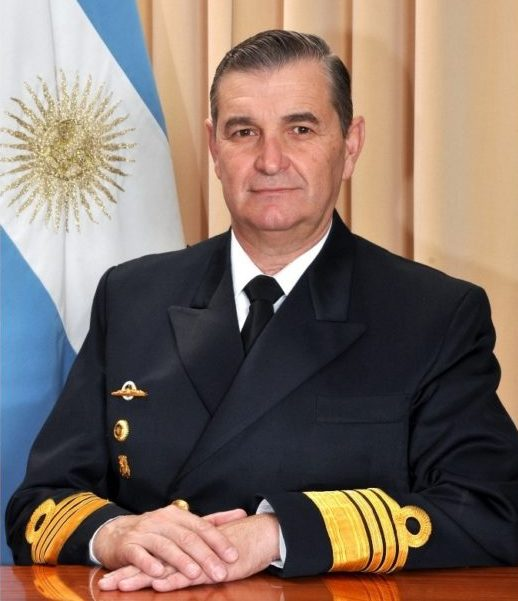
- Born: 29 March 1957 (age 69)
- Military career
- Allegiance: Argentina
- Branch: Navy
- Rank: Vice Admiral
- Commands: Chief of the General Staff of the Navy (2016–2017)

Vice Admiral Marcelo Eduardo Hipólito Srur (born March 29, 1957) is a former Argentine Navy officer, whose last position was Chief of the General Staff of the Navy — i.e., the head of Argentine Navy.

== Career ==
He graduated from the Naval Academy in 1979. He served as Commander of Training and Recruiting from 2013 until his appointment as Chief of the General Staff.

On 15 December 2017, Srur was removed from his post following the disappearance of the San Juan the month before.
