= ARA Puerto Deseado =

Argentine Navy oceanographic survey ship

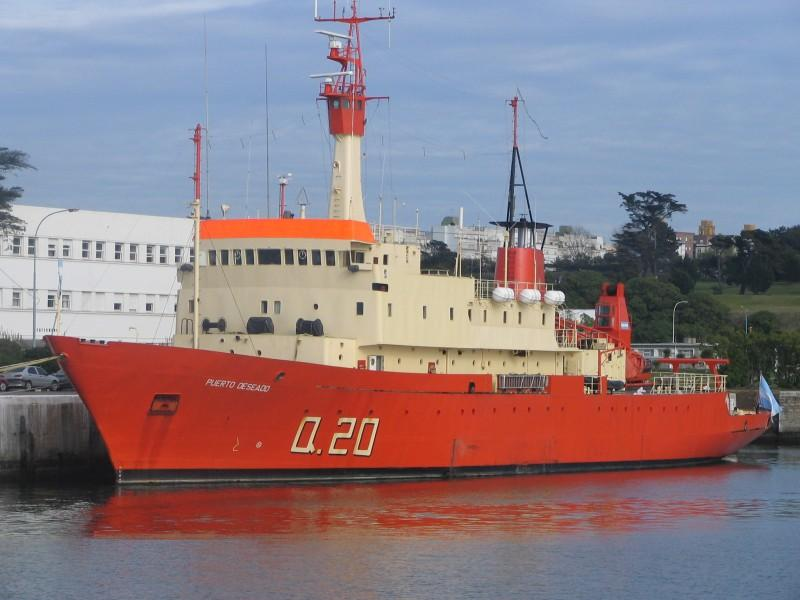
- ARA Puerto Deseado in Mar del Plata

History

Argentina
- Name: Puerto Deseado
- Namesake: Puerto Deseado
- Ordered: 7 December 1971
- Builder: Astarsa
- Launched: 8 December 1976
- Commissioned: 11 December 1978
- Identification: MMSI number: 701000015; Callsign: LOPD
- Status: in service as of 2018

General characteristics
- Displacement: 2400 tons (full)
- Length: 76.8 m (252 ft)
- Beam: 15.8 m (52 ft)
- Draft: 3.5 m (11 ft)
- Propulsion: 2 MAN AG 9L20/27 Diesel-electric 900 KW each 2 motores eléctricos de corriente alternada marca ABB de 380 V, 120 kW para propulsión auxiliar • sistema de hélice de paso variable BERG • 4 alternadores Stamford modelo MHC 534 C2 de 380 V, 50 Hz, accionados por motores diésel marca MTU-Mercedez Benz de 12 cilindros en "V" • 1 alternador auxiliar Siemens de 400V 50 HZ, accionados un motor diésel Deutz de 6 cilindros en línea
- Speed: 14 knots (26 km/h)
- Range: 12,000 mi (19,000 km) at 12 knots (22 km/h), 90 days
- Complement: 60 + 20 scientist
- Sensors & processing systems: navigation radar Decca 1629
- Armament: none

ARA Puerto Deseado (Q-20) is an oceanographic survey ship in service in the Argentine Navy. She has a reinforced hull in order to operate in waters around Antarctica.

== History ==
Puerto Deseado was built by Astilleros Argentinos Río de la Plata (Astarsa) shipyard in Tigre, Buenos Aires and commissioned into the Argentine Navy in 1978. She was the first navy ship to be named upon the city of Puerto Deseado in the patagonian Santa Cruz province.

During the 1982 Falklands War she served as hospital ship.

On 2003 she participated on the unsuccessful attempt to find the sunken cruiser ARA General Belgrano along with a National Geographic team on the vessel Seacor Lenga.

Puerto Deseado serves the CONICET, the Argentine government agency that directs and co-ordinates scientific and technical research. The ship actively participated on the summer Antarctic campaigns. Her scientific equipment includes a gravimetric sensor, magnetometers, seismic systems, high frequency sound sonar and a geological laboratory.

In 2007, Puerto Deseado and Comodoro Rivadavia, were reequipped by Kongsberg Gruppen with bathymetric systems in a program sponsored by the UNDP (United Nations Development Programs). Since then, Puerto Deseado was involved in the investigation of the continental shelf of the Argentine Sea that was finally submitted on 22 April 2009 to the United Nations (UN) for 1,700,000 square kilometres (660,000 mi^{2}) of ocean territory to be recognised as Argentina's as governed by the Convention on the Continental Shelf and Convention on the Law of the Sea.

In March 2010 she began studies on behalf of Repsol YPF.

She is homeported at Mar del Plata.
