= Pacific (ship) =

Numerous ships have been called Pacific. They include

- SS Pacific, several ships
- MS Pacific, a cruise ship launched in 1971 as Sea Venture, renamed Pacific Princess in 1975, and Pacific in 2002
