= ARA Comodoro Rivadavia (Q-11) =

Survey ship of the Argentine Navy

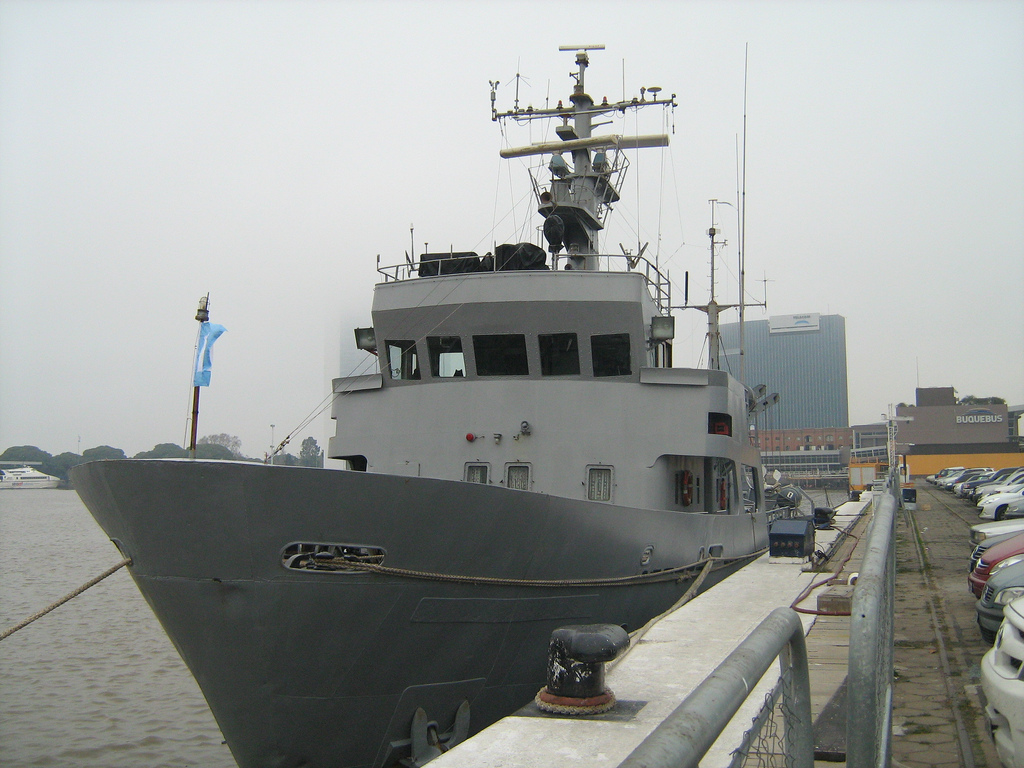

History

Argentina
- Name: Comodoro Rivadavia
- Namesake: Comodoro Rivadavia
- Builder: Astilleros Mestrina
- Commissioned: December 1974
- Out of service: 2024
- Status: Out of service; to be put up for public auction as of 2024

General characteristics
- Displacement: 827 tons (full)
- Length: 52.2 m (171 ft 3 in)
- Beam: 8.8 m (28 ft 10 in)
- Draft: 2.9 m (9 ft 6 in)
- Propulsion: 2 Stork Werkspoor diesel-electric 600 hp (450 kW) each
- Speed: 12 knots (22 km/h; 14 mph)
- Range: 6,000 mi (9,700 km) at 12 knots
- Complement: 36

ARA Comodoro Rivadavia (Q-11) was a survey ship of the Argentine Navy assigned to the national Hydrographic Naval Service (SHN for Servicio de Hidrografia Naval) which among other things is responsible of the maintenance of nautical charts and navigational aids

== Construction and equipment ==
Comodoro Rivadavia was built by the Mestrina de Tigre shipyard, Buenos Aires. She was laid down on July 17, 1971, and launched on December 2, 1972. She was delivered to the Argentine Navy on December 6, 1974.

The ship displaced 609 tons with standard load and 667 t with full load. Her length measured 52.2 meters, her beam was 8.8 m and her draft was 2.6 m. The ship was powered by two 1160 hp Werkspoor Stork RHO-218K diesel engines, which allowed her to reach a speed of 12 knots (22 km/h). She had two controllable pitch propellers that allowed the ship to maneuver in tight spaces.

=== Hydrographic systems ===
The ship was classified as a hydrographic vessel equipped with probes and bathymetric sensors.

In 2007, along with ARA Puerto Deseado, was reequipped by Kongsberg Gruppen with bathymetric systems in a program sponsored by the UNDP (United Nations Development Programs).

In 2011, the ship's hydrographic equipment were listed as follows:

- Differential Satellite Navigator (DGPS) for precision unit positioning
- Three sonar echosounders, one of them portable for object detection
- Plotter for making bathymetric maps
- Fax-modem - for reception of weather charts
- Semi-rigid boat of 5.6 m in length, 70 HP engine, equipped with DGPS satellite navigator and computer with "Hidronav" 2

== Mission History ==
Comodoro Rivadavia carried out various scientific research missions, and was an important asset for carrying out Argentina's National Cartographic Plan, by conducting hydrographic surveys on navigable routes. She also regularly conducted Antarctic campaigns and research.

In May 1998, she provided assistance to those affected by coastal flooding caused by the El Niño phenomenon.

Beginning in 2007 this ship was involved in mapping the Patagonian continental shelf of the Argentine Sea. This project was submitted to the United Nations (UN) on 22 April 2009 to support Argentina's claim that 1,700,000 square kilometres (660,000 mi^{2}) of ocean should be in the Argentinian Exclusive economic zone under the Convention on the Continental Shelf and Convention on the Law of the Sea. This claim was recognized by the UN in 2016.

In July 2013, she participated in the search for a crew member of the Virgen María fishing boat, who disappeared at sea.

In September 2014, the ship used its hydrographic instrumentation to assist in a SARSUB exercise with the Salta submarine.

In November 2017, she participated in the search for the missing Argentine Navy submarine, ARA San Juan (S-42). The wreckage of the sub was finally discovered a year after sinking.

The ship remained on the navy list as of 2022, but was reported as likely soon to be placed on the disposal list. In 2024 it was announced that the ship was to be auctioned off.
