= Eliana Krawczyk =

Argentine naval officer

Eliana María Krawczyk
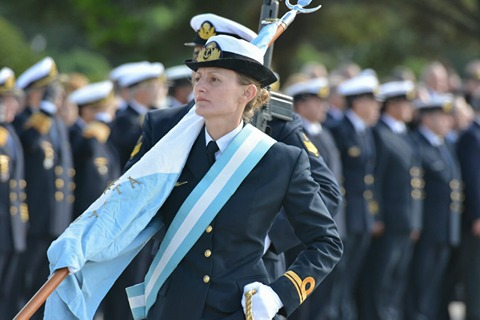
- Born: 5 March 1982; Oberá, Argentina
- Died: 15 November 2017 (aged 35); ARA San Juan, Argentine Sea
- Military career
- Allegiance: Argentina
- Branch: Argentine Navy
- Service years: 2003–2017
- Rank: Corvette captain
- Unit: ARA San Juan

Eliana María Krawczyk (Spanish pronunciation: [eˈljana maˈɾia kɾauˈsik]; 5 March 1982 – 15 November 2017) was an officer of the Argentine Navy. She was among the 44 crew members of the Argentine submarine ARA San Juan when it sank on 15 November 2017.

== Early life and education ==
Eliana María Krawczyk was born on 5 March 1982 in Oberá, Misiones Province, Argentina, to two Jewish Polish immigrants. She entered primary school at age five.

== Career ==
In 2003, while studying industrial engineering in her hometown, Krawczyk learned through an internet advertisement that the Argentine Navy was recruiting women. She traveled to Posadas, Misiones to enlist that year and was enrolled at the Naval Military School the next year. She graduated in 2008 and was assigned to the ARA Libertad for training. It was here that she became interested in submarines. Once her eight-month training period had elapsed, she signed up for submarine training in Mar del Plata.

Krawczyk went to submarine school in 2012 and graduated at the top of her class. She was assigned first to the ARA Salta, remaining there for four years. This posting made Krawczyk the first female submariner in Latin America. In 2016, she transferred to ARA San Juan.

On 8 October 2015, the Argentine Navy promoted Krawczyk to the rank of Frigate lieutenant, making her the Navy's first female submarine officer. For this distinction, she was personally congratulated by Juan Carlos Agulla, Vice President of the Misiones Chamber of Representatives.

She was promoted again, to Lieutenant, by decree of the Argentine government on 17 March 2017.

=== Disappearance of ARA San Juan ===
Location of the wreck

On 17 November 2017, ARA San Juan disappeared off the San Jorge Gulf while sailing to Mar del Plata after a military exercise. Krawczyk was among the 44 crew members aboard ARA San Juan when it disappeared. When the submarine was not located for a week, she and the rest of the crew were presumed dead by the Argentine government. The submarine's wreckage was found a year later 907 meters (2,976 ft) underwater, 250 nautical miles (460 km) from the San Jorge Gulf. At the time of the submarine's loss, Krawczyk was its third highest-ranking officer and the only woman aboard. Krawczyk's sister joined the search parties that continued to look for the missing submarine, but had left 10 days before the discovery of the wreck.

== Legacy ==
To honor Krawczyk's memory, the city of Oberá announced 27 days after ARA San Juan's disappearance that it would name a street after her. Argentina's Jewish community honored Krawczyk on International Women's Day, 9 March 2018, in a ceremony at the Alvear Hotel in Buenos Aires. 500 guests attended the event, including Rabbi Alejandro Avruj and politicians Carolina Stanley and Patricia Bullrich.
