= International Submarine Escape and Rescue Liaison Office =

Organization coordinating submarine search-and-rescue operations

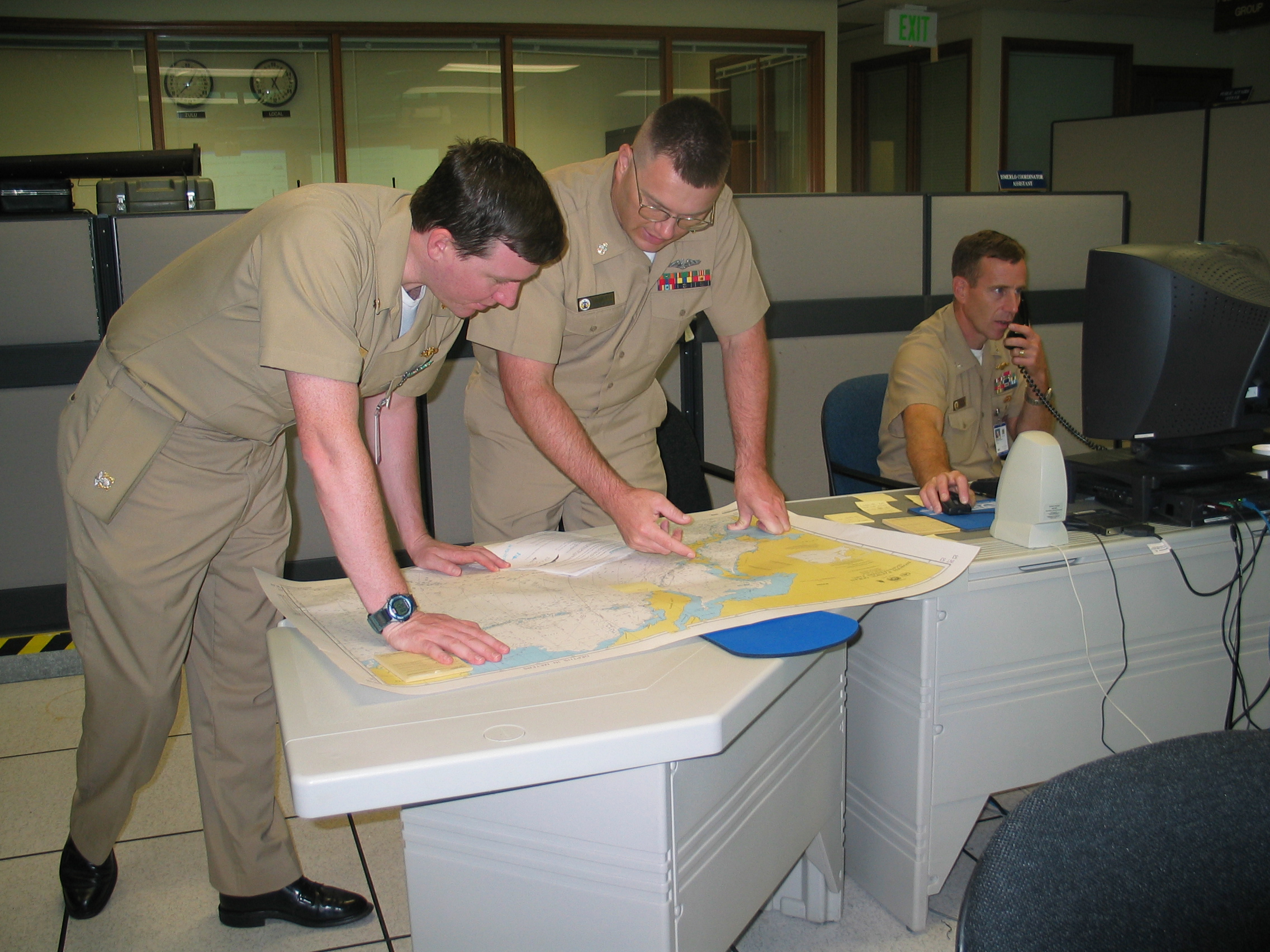
US Navy personnel staffing the International Submarine Escape and Rescue Liaison Office's watch floor in August 2005

The International Submarine Escape and Rescue Liaison Office ("ISMERLO") is an organization that coordinates international submarine search and rescue operations. It was established in 2003 by NATO and the Submarine Escape and Rescue Working Group (SMERWG) following the disaster of the Russian submarine K-141 Kursk. Its purpose is to provide an international liaison service to prevent peacetime submarine accidents, and to quickly respond on a global basis if they occur.

It consists of an international team of submarine escape and rescue experts based at Northwood, UK. The aim of ISMERLO is to establish endorsed procedures as the international standard for submarine escape and rescue using consultation and consensus among submarine-operating nations. It offers advice on training and procurement, and an inspection and monitoring service. It provides online information about Submarine Escape and Rescue (SMER) and aims to enable the rapid callout of international rescue systems in the event of a submarine accident.

The Submarine Escape and Rescue Working Group (SMERWG) covers technical and procedural issues, and aims to share information and define mutually accepted standards for design and operation of SMER systems. It also provides a forum for problems and exercises to be discussed with experts in the field.

== Activities ==
On 21 April 2021 the Indonesian Navy sent a request to ISMERLO for assistance regarding KRI Nanggala (402), which went missing 95 km (51 nautical miles) north of Bali during a torpedo drill.

== See also ==
- Category:Lost submarines by country
