= Convention on the Continental Shelf =

1958 international treaty

- Signed: 29 April 1958
- Location: Geneva, Switzerland
- Effective: 10 June 1964
- Signatories: 43
- Parties: 58
- Languages: Chinese, English, French, Russian and Spanish

Full text
- Convention on the Continental Shelf at Wikisource
- legal.un.org/

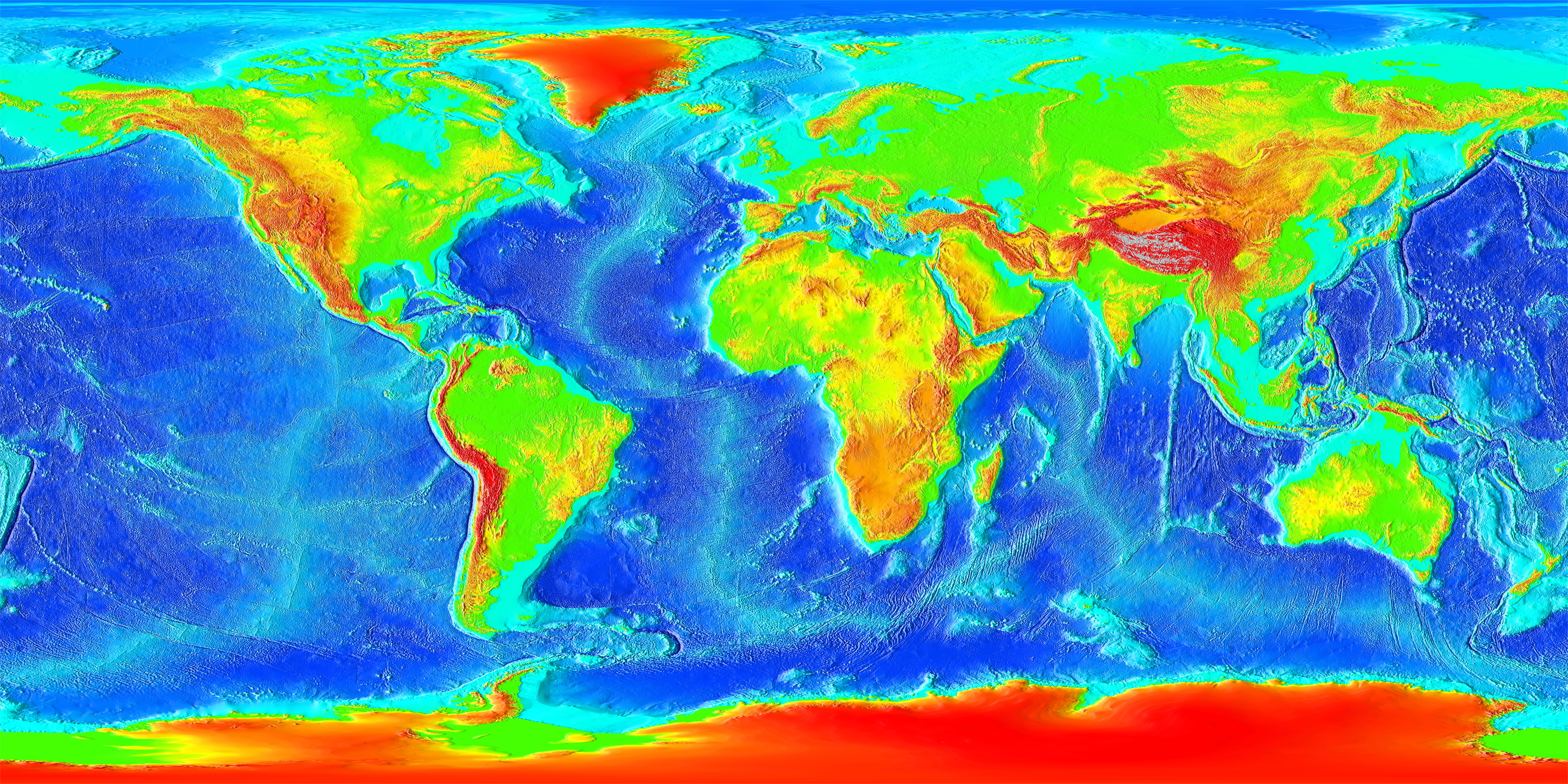
The global continental shelf, highlighted in cyan

The Convention on the Continental Shelf was an international treaty created to codify the rules of international law relating to continental shelves. The treaty, after entering into force 10 June 1964, established the rights of a sovereign state over the continental shelf surrounding it, if there be any. The treaty was one of three agreed upon at the first United Nations Convention on the Law of the Sea (UNCLOS I). It has since been superseded by a new agreement reached in 1982 at UNCLOS III.

The treaty dealt with seven topics: the regime governing the superjacent waters and airspace; laying or maintenance of submarine cables or pipelines; the regime governing navigation, fishing, scientific research and the coastal state's competence in these areas; delimitation; tunneling.

== Historical background ==
The Convention on the Continental Shelf replaced the earlier practice of nations having sovereignty over only a very narrow strip of the sea surrounding them, with anything beyond that strip considered International Waters. This policy was used until President of the United States Harry S. Truman proclaimed that the resources on the continental shelf contiguous to the United States belonged to the United States through an Executive Order on 28 September 1945. Many other nations quickly adapted similar policies, most stating that their portion of the sea extended either 12 or 200 nautical miles from its coast.

== Rights of states ==
Article 1 of the convention defined the term shelf in terms of exploitability rather than relying upon the geological definition. It defined a shelf "to the seabed and subsoil of the submarine areas adjacent to the coast but outside the area of the territorial sea, to a depth of 200 meters or, beyond that limit, to where the depth of the superjacent waters admits of the exploitation of the natural resources of the said areas" or "to the seabed and subsoil of similar submarine areas adjacent to the coasts of islands".

Besides outlining what is legal in continental shelf areas, it also dictated what could not be done in Article 5.

== Participants ==
Country	Ratification Year	Country	Ratification Year
Albania	1964	Mauritius	1970
Australia	1963	Mexico	1966
Belarus	1961	Netherlands	1966
Bosnia and Herzegovina	1994	New Zealand	1965
Bulgaria	1962	Nigeria	1961
Cambodia	1960	Norway	1971
Canada	1970	Poland	1962
Colombia	1960	Portugal	1963
Costa Rica	1972	Romania	1961
Croatia	1992	Russian Federation	1960
Cyprus	1974	Senegal	1961
Czech Republic	1993	Sierra Leone	1966
Denmark	1963	Slovakia	1993
Dominican Republic	1964	Solomon Islands	1981
Fiji	1971	South Africa	1963
Finland	1965	Spain	1971
France	1965	Swaziland	1970
Greece	1972	Sweden	1966
Guatemala	1961	Switzerland	1966
Haiti	1960	Thailand	1968
Israel	1961	Tonga	1971
Jamaica	1965	Trinidad and Tobago	1968
Kenya	1969	Uganda	1964
Latvia	1992	Ukraine	1961
Lesotho	1973	United Kingdom	1964
Madagascar	1962	United States	1961
Malawi	1965	Venezuela	1961
Malaysia	1960	Yugoslavia	1966
Malta	1966

== UNCLOS II and III ==
In 1960, the United Nations held another conference regarding the Laws of the Sea, UNCLOS II, but no agreements were reached. However, another conference was called in 1973 to address the issues. UNCLOS III, which lasted until 1982 due to a required consensus, adjusted and redefined many principles stated in the first UNCLOS. The new definition of the Continental shelf in the new Convention rendered the 1958 Convention on the Continental Shelf obsolete. The principal reason for this was technological advancements.
