= List of chiefs of the general staff of the Argentine Navy =

Chief of the General Staff of the Argentine Navy
- Jefe del Estado Mayor General de la Armada
- Seal of the Argentine Navy

- Flag of the Chief

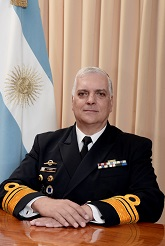
- Incumbent; Admiral Juan Carlos Romay since 12 December 2025
- Argentine Navy
- Reports to: Chief of the Joint Chiefs of Staff
- Appointer: President of Argentina
- Formation: 1 May 1958
- First holder: Adolfo B. Estévez

This article lists the chiefs of the General Staff of the Argentine Navy and their preceding offices, between 1958 and the present day. The Argentine Navy (Spanish: Armada Argentina) is the naval force of Argentina.

The current Chief of the Navy General Staff is Admiral Juan Carlos Romay. He was appointed by President Javier Milei on 12 December 2025.

== List ==
No.	Portrait	Name (Birth–Death)	Term		
No.	Portrait	Name (Birth–Death)	Took office	Left office	Time in office
Commander of the Naval Operations of the Navy (Comandante de Operaciones Navales de la Armada)
1	Adolfo B. Estévez [es]	Admiral; Adolfo B. Estévez (1908–1982)	1 May 1958	14 July 1959	1 year, 74 days
2	Alberto P. Vago [es]	Admiral; Alberto P. Vago (1910–2004)	15 July 1959	29 December 1961	2 years, 167 days
3	Agustín Penas [es]	Admiral; Agustín Penas (1910–1970)	29 December 1961	2 October 1962	277 days
4	Leandro Maloberti [es]	Admiral; Leandro Maloberti (1912–2000)	2 October 1962	11 December 1962	70 days
5	Enrique Grünwaldt [es]	Vice Admiral; Enrique Grünwaldt (1913–1986)	12 December 1962	2 April 1963	111 days
6	Eladio Vázquez [es]	Vice Admiral; Eladio Vázquez (1916–2000)	2 April 1963	26 October 1963	207 days
Commander-in-Chief of the Navy (Comandante en jefe de la Armada)
7	Benigno Varela [es]	Admiral; Benigno Varela (1917–1996)	29 October 1963	4 October 1968	4 years, 344 days
8	Pedro Gnavi [es]	Admiral; Pedro Gnavi (1917–1990)	4 October 1968	3 January 1972	3 years, 91 days
9	Carlos Coda [es]	Admiral; Carlos Coda (1918–2004)	3 January 1972	25 May 1973	1 year, 142 days
General Commander of the Navy (Comandante general de la Armada)
10	Carlos Álvarez [es]	Admiral; Carlos Álvarez (1924–2003)	25 May 1973	6 December 1973	195 days
Commander-in-Chief of the Navy (Comandante en jefe de la Armada)
11	Emilio Eduardo Massera	Admiral; Emilio Eduardo Massera (1925–2010)	6 December 1973	15 September 1978	4 years, 283 days
12	Armando Lambruschini	Admiral; Armando Lambruschini (1924–2004)	15 September 1978	11 September 1981	2 years, 361 days
13	Jorge Anaya	Admiral; Jorge Anaya (1926–2008)	11 September 1981	1 October 1982	1 year, 20 days
14	Rubén Oscar Franco	Admiral; Rubén Oscar Franco (1927–2025)	1 October 1982	5 December 1983	1 year, 65 days
Chief of the General Staff of the Navy (Jefe del Estado Mayor General de la Armada)
15	Ramón Arosa [es]	Admiral; Ramón Arosa (1931–2025)	16 December 1983	14 July 1989	5 years, 210 days
16	Jorge Ferrer [es]	Admiral; Jorge Ferrer (1933–2009)	14 July 1989	13 July 1993	3 years, 364 days
17	Enrique Molina Pico	Admiral; Enrique Molina Pico (1938–2025)	13 July 1993	24 July 1996	3 years, 11 days
18	Carlos Marrón [es]	Admiral; Carlos Marrón (1938–2003)	24 July 1996	13 December 1999	3 years, 142 days
19	Joaquín Stella [es]	Admiral; Joaquín Stella (1942–2017)	13 December 1999	6 June 2003	3 years, 175 days
20	Jorge Godoy	Admiral; Jorge Godoy (born 1946)	6 June 2003	22 December 2011	8 years, 199 days
21	Carlos Paz [es]	Admiral; Carlos Paz (born 1953)	22 December 2011	15 October 2012	298 days
22	Daniel Alberto Martin [es]	Admiral; Daniel Alberto Martin (born 1955)	15 October 2012	3 July 2013	261 days
23	Gastón Erice [es]	Admiral; Gastón Erice (born 1955)	3 July 2013	14 January 2016	2 years, 195 days
24	Marcelo Srur	Admiral; Marcelo Srur (born 1957)	14 January 2016	18 December 2017	1 year, 338 days
–	José Luis Villán [es]	Vice Admiral; José Luis Villán (born 1960); Acting	18 December 2017	28 September 2018	284 days
25	José Luis Villán [es]	Admiral; José Luis Villán (born 1960)	28 September 2018	28 February 2020	1 year, 153 days
26	Julio Guardia	Admiral; Julio Guardia (born 1962)	28 February 2020	2 January 2024	3 years, 308 days
27	Carlos María Allievi [es]	Admiral; Carlos María Allievi (born 1965)	2 January 2024	12 December 2025	1 year, 344 days
28	Juan Carlos Romay [es]	Admiral; Juan Carlos Romay (born 1966)	12 December 2025	Incumbent	327 days

== See also ==
- Argentine Armed Forces
- Chief of the Joint Chiefs of Staff (Argentina)
- Chief of the General Staff of the Argentine Army
- Chief of the General Staff of the Argentine Air Force
