= Political positions of Javier Milei =

Views of the incumbent president of Argentina

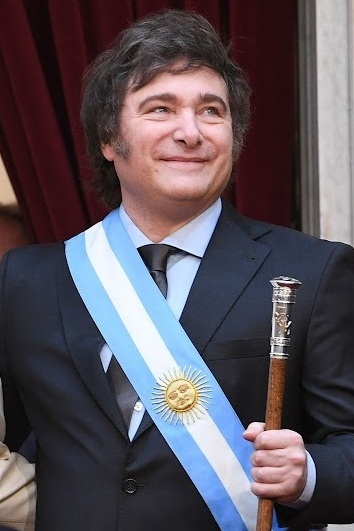
Milei in 2023

Media outlets have variously referred to Javier Milei, the 59th president of Argentina since 2023, as right-wing populist, and right-wing libertarian. Economically, they have described his positions as neoliberal, ultraliberal and libertarian-authoritarian. Milei has been colloquially referred to as Mileism (Spanish: Mileísmo). Milei primarily identifies as a minarchist and liberal-libertarian, or classical liberal, while also aligning theoretically with anarcho-capitalism and paleolibertarianism.

He advocates for a more limited government, focused solely on justice and security. Milei's philosophical underpinnings rest on the concepts of non-aggression and self-ownership, emphasizing respect for life, liberty, and property, in accord with free-market principles. Some commentators and political scientists recognize these views as fundamentally libertarian, while others focus on the space Milei occupies in the context of populist or right-wing politics globally.

A staunch opponent of government intervention in the economy, Milei asserts that state involvement hampers economic growth, and identifies Keynesian economic policies as a primary factor in Argentina's financial challenges. He opposes socialist and communist ideologies, which he regards as oppressive systems that generate poverty and hunger. Milei also takes a critical stance on the Central Bank of Argentina and taxation policies, proposing radical changes aimed at economic liberalization and restructuring of governmental ministries. He proposes radical changes in foreign relations, while being pro-United States, pro-Israel, and criticizing socialist governments.

== Economic views ==
Milei describes himself as an anarcho-capitalist, minarchist, paleolibertarian, and liberal-libertarian, which is close to libertarianism in the United States and classical liberalism. He is an outspoken advocate for economic liberalism and fiscal conservatism, subscribing to the Austrian School of economics and taking a critical stance against Keynesian economics. Milei draws his economic philosophy from a wide array of thinkers and economists, spanning from classical figures like Adam Smith to modern theorists like Murray Rothbard, Friedrich Hayek, Milton Friedman, Gary Becker, and Jesús Huerta de Soto. Milei has expressed particular admiration for the economic policies of former Argentine president Carlos Menem and his economy minister Domingo Cavallo, referring to their administration as the "most economically successful in Argentine history." His views also find resonance with historical Argentine figures like Juan Bautista Alberdi, and contemporary economists like Alberto Benegas Lynch.

=== Economic systems ===
Milei promotes capitalism and free enterprise, and strongly opposes communism and socialism. In a TEDx presentation that went viral on social media in February 2019, Milei presented what he described as "a love story" about capitalism, arguing how capitalism and the free market have lifted people out of poverty. He then cited what he describes as myths regarding capitalism, rejecting the idea that the Nordic model is socialist, and stating that the Nordic countries are "more pro-market than people think". Believing that making everyone economically equal is impossible and undesirable, he asserted that labeling social inequality a problem is a "lying hoax", saying that "social justice is unjust". He concluded that this was a debate about values, and that socialism embodies envy, resentment, and coercion, while capitalism or liberalism stands for the unrestricted respect for the life project of fellow individuals.

In an interview in November 2020, Milei said: "I hate communists, shitty left-wingers, because they hate life." He called the left an economic, social, and cultural failure that murdered 150 million human beings, asserting that the socialist model is "the model of poverty, this world is totally crazy." He further stated that there are only two systems, liberalism or communism, as he believes that any intermediate solution is unstable and tends to drift towards communism. In 2021, he signed a letter sponsored by Vox that railed against "the advance of communism" in the Spanish-speaking world, and was endorsed by Eduardo Bolsonaro and José Antonio Kast. In October 2021, he reiterated his anti-leftist views, saying: "I will ally with all those who believe that the left is the enemy."

=== Government size and public spending ===
Milei has proposed a radical restructuring of the Argentine government, advocating for a reduction in the number of ministries from 24 to 8. Notably, he has called for the elimination or merging of major ministries such as the Ministry of Education, the Ministry of Social Development, the Ministry of Women, Genders and Diversity, and the Ministry of Health.

Beyond institutional restructuring, Milei has pledged to address Argentina's economic challenges through swift, significant reductions in government spending, and radical economic "shock therapy" aimed at tackling issues like inflation. According to his adviser Darío Epstein, Milei aims to balance the budget within three months. Epstein elaborated, stating: "The first thing we have to do is to lower the fiscal deficit by 5 percentage points, which is not at all easy. As Argentina is in a very critical situation, with 40 to 45 per cent poverty; what we should not do is to fire people from the public sector or lower social spending. That is very important." Additionally, Milei has been a vocal critic of previous administrations, including those of Cristina Fernández de Kirchner, Mauricio Macri, and Alberto Fernández. He cites their excessive government spending and lack of fiscal adjustment as major concerns.

=== Central Bank of Argentina and monetary policy ===
Milei has criticized the Central Bank of Argentina, describing it as "one of the greatest thieves in the history of mankind." He said: "Central banks are divided in four categories: the bad ones, like the Federal Reserve, the very bad ones, like the ones in Latin America, the horribly bad ones, and the Central Bank of Argentina." He advocates for the eventual dismantling of the Central Bank to allow citizens to freely choose their monetary systems. He is also a proponent of a dollarized economy as a measure to counter the country's persistent inflation problems. Commenting on the Convertibility plan of the 1990s, Milei stated: "Convertibility was launched on [1 April] 1991. By January of 1993, we were the country with the lowest inflation in the world. I propose the free competition of currencies, full reform of the financial system. Thus, the most probable thing is that Argentines choose the dollar."

=== Taxation ===
Milei articulates a critical view of the role of the state in economic matters, calling it "the greatest enemy of wealth". He asserts that an enlarged state, funded by taxes, can result in reduced real wages. When financed by debt, Milei argues that this essentially constitutes deferred taxation. Furthermore, he contends that if the state accrues external debt, this could lead to a negative impact on the equilibrium exchange rate, thereby raising the cost of essential goods and exacerbating poverty. Milei describes Argentina as a tax hell, and emphasizes the role of the state as a hindrance to economic freedom, saying "the state is the problem, not the solution". Within this framework, he aligns himself with liberal traditions that seek to minimize state intervention, invoking concepts like "Life, liberty, and property" as foundational rights. Milei maintains that current taxation policies serve as obstacles to these rights and envisions liberalism as a means to alleviate what he identifies as state-imposed constraints.

As an example, Milei cited the Prohibition era in the United States, which he considered an arbitrary limit to personal freedoms, and praised the gangster Al Capone as a hero for defying the prohibition and selling alcohol in black markets. He considered that it was the state who started the violence of the prohibition era, and concluded "The question is why he went to jail. For tax evasion. That's the lesson: politicians don't care if you're a murderer or a thief, as long as you don't touch their stuff. The only sacred cow is the politicians' asses".

=== Privatization ===
Milei supports privatizing state-owned enterprises, including shale driller YPF, and roads, and pledged to scrap soy taxes and ditch an electric-vehicle battery bid as part of his deregulation program. He also articulated his intention to either shut down, privatize, or redefine the National Scientific and Technical Research Council, which prompted criticism among Argentine researchers.

=== Social security ===
Milei described the addendum to Article 14 of the Argentine Constitution, introduced by Perón, which guarantees labor rights, pensions, and the entire social security system, as the country's cancer.

=== Organ trade ===
Milei said that he is in favor of selling organs on the market.

== Social views ==
On social issues, Milei has been labeled as socially conservative.

=== Abortion and euthanasia ===
Milei opposes both abortion and euthanasia, grounding his views in propertarian terms, as he sees them as violating the non-aggression principle. He considers abortion to be a violation of property rights, and equates it with theft. Milei holds that abortion is morally indefensible, even in cases of rape, and supports it only when the mother's life is endangered. He plans to hold a referendum on Argentina's 2020 abortion legalization law, and has indicated he would support its repeal. He has stated that his opposition to abortion is based on what he said is an "unrestricted right to life". Arguing about the beginning of human personhood, he said that human life begins at conception.

=== LGBTQ rights and issues ===
Milei is indifferent to same-sex marriage; he sees marriage as a contract, and is opposed to it as an institution. He has also stated that homosexuality is a "personal choice", and is not a disease, saying that he would respect any type of consensual sex, hyperbolically including sex with an elephant.

On the topic of transgender rights, Milei has stated that he "does not care" about gender identification "as long as you do not make me pay the bill", and compared it to identifying as a cougar. In an interview with Clarín, he said: "... if you want to perceive yourself, be a cougar. Do it. I have no problem, but don't impose it on me by the state. Don't steal money from people to impose someone else's ideas on them. That is violent."

In a January 2025 speech at the World Economic Forum, Milei argued there was an "LGBT agenda", saying, "In its most extreme version, gender ideology simply and plainly constitutes child abuse. They're pedophiles." In the same conference, Milei made a reference to a case of two American gay men from Walton County, Georgia –William and Zachary Zulock–, who were convicted in December 2024 of sexually abusing their adoptive children and sentenced each to 100 years in prison without parole. Milei later defended himself and denied the association between the US case and gay men in Argentina, saying that the opposition used falsehoods and ad hominem to attack him.

In February 2025, Milei's government implemented a ban on gender-affirming care under the age of 18, as part of Milei's war on "woke ideology". In April 2025, a Federal Court ruled that the ban was unconstitutional, restoring access to care for minors nationwide.

=== Education ===
Milei supports school choice, and wants to implement an education voucher system to privatize and decentralize education by "giving the budget to parents". He intends to eliminate the law that makes comprehensive sex education (CSE) in schools mandatory, which he has linked to brainwashing, and said that students are "hostages of a system of state indoctrination".

=== Health care ===
Milei wants to privatize public health care providers. Within the context of the COVID-19 pandemic in Argentina, he opposed mandatory vaccination.

=== Drugs ===
In Argentina, drugs are decriminalized. Milei voted against the cannabis law in Congress as a National Deputy. Although his coalition's government program proposes to pursue drug trafficking, and he commented that one of his biggest concerns is that many young Argentines fall into drugs, Milei supports drug legalization within the context of a free society. He has compared drug use to suicide, and cautioned: "If you want to commit suicide, I don't have any problem. Drugging is committing suicide gradually. If you want to get high, do whatever you want, but don't ask me to pay the bill." Milei also said that he had smoked marijuana only once, and recalled: "I remember laughing a lot."

=== Gun laws ===
A supporter of law-and-order politics, Milei endorses the unrestricted ownership of firearms, saying that Argentina needs the forces "to have authority again". Gun laws in Argentina are restrictive. According to his party's manifesto, Milei proposes the "deregulation of the legal market" for weapons and "the protection of its legitimate and responsible use by the citizens".

=== Immigration and foreigners ===
Argentina is one of the few countries whose constitution establishes the promotion of immigration as one of the duties of the state; Argentina and the United States accepted more immigrants than any other country around the turn of the 20th century. Milei's 2023 manifesto included restrictions on immigration, with Milei stating that he would prohibit the entry into the country of migrants with a criminal record, and said that he wanted to expel those who commit crimes. Milei's manifesto also proposed to restrict free education and universal healthcare for foreign nationals. In May 2025, Milei signed a decree to tighten immigration laws in Argentina. Milei said that immigrants were bringing "chaos and abuse" to Argentina and ordered that the path to citizenship be stricted, with foreign nationals having to reside two years without interruption in Argentina and show proof of income or "sufficient means", plus a clean criminal record in their home countries. In March 2026, while attending a CPAC Summit in Hungary, Milei stated "that when immigration doesn't culturally assimilate to the host country, it stops being immigration and becomes invasion".

== Argentine politics ==
=== Liberalism and Peronism ===
Milei argues that "the only time that pure liberalism was applied was in 1860, and we were a prosperous country". He criticized the governments of Hipólito Yrigoyen, Juan Perón, Raúl Alfonsín, Cristina Fernández de Kirchner, and Alberto Fernández. Milei characterized 1930s Argentina as a fascist regime that led to Peronism and Perón's "three-legged fascism" rather than a return to liberal policies.

=== Argentine politicians ===
In a debate before the 2021 primary elections, Frente de Todos candidate Leandro Santoro asked Milei whether he had ever worked for the public sector, since he advocates the state's abolition. Milei had criticized Santoro as "a state parasite", and said: "I understand that you are 45 years old, and you have been involved in politics since you were 14. Have you ever worked in the private sector in your life?" Santoro alleged that Milei was "an employee of the National Congress in 1994, and reported for the former "genocidal" general Antonio Domingo Bussi", who, at the time, was a national deputy. In response, Milei acknowledged having worked for Bussi through his Twitter account.

Milei excluded the Juntos por el Cambio leader and former president Mauricio Macri from the political caste he denounces for what he regards as their collectivist policies. Instead, he criticized Juntos por el Cambio member María Eugenia Vidal, who had said that "we share the same values", as governor of the Buenos Aires Province, for not keeping her campaign promises of lower taxes. Milei called Patricia Bullrich, the 2023 Juntos por el Cambio leader, "part of the Argentine failure".

In a September 2022 speech to Argentina's Chamber of Deputies, Milei criticized Macri for his proposal not to put a dollar into the Aerolíneas Argentinas, wondering why he did not do that while president, and questioned the government 2023 budget. He also referred to the attempted assassination of Fernández de Kirchner as "not a magnicide [the assassination of a major political figure]", claiming that the term implies that what he regards as the political caste is above the people.

=== Military coups and "Dirty War" ===
Milei questions the governments and policies applied by the Radical Civic Union, the Justicialist Party, and military coups in Argentina. While publicly expressing that he is not a defender of the last Argentine military dictatorship, the National Reorganization Process, or the so-called "Dirty War", he has questioned the estimate of 30,000 said to have disappeared during that period of conflict. In September 2022, he again questioned the toll, asking: "Where are they? Show me the list." He described the military dictatorship of Jorge Videla as the leader of "one of the darkest periods of Argentine history" but that "it was also something that was quite complicated". His view is that the guerrilla terrorists of the 1970s should be condemned like the Argentine military dictatorship, seeing that period as a war between the state and terrorism.

== Foreign relations ==
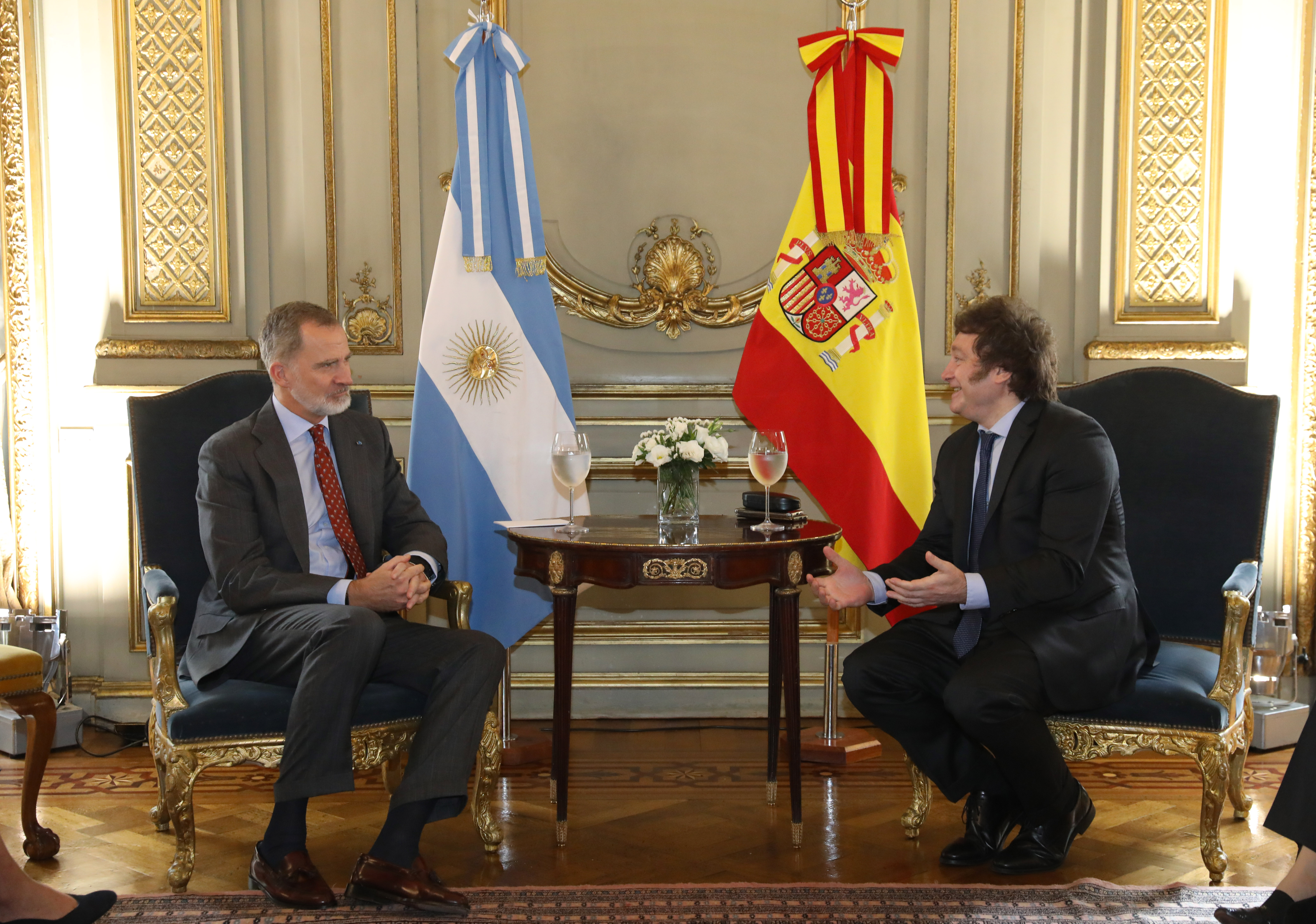
Milei with Spanish King Felipe VI on 9 December 2023

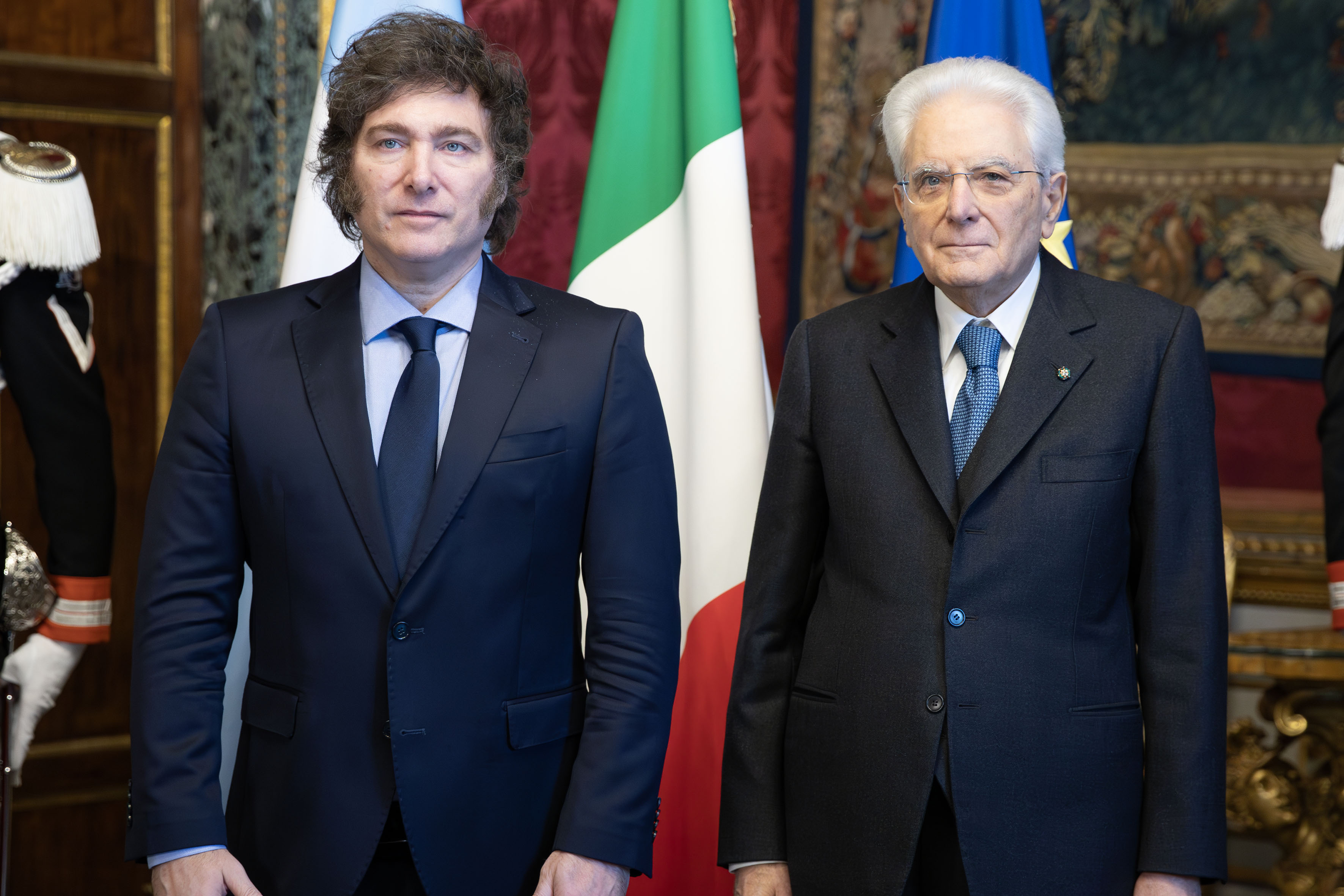
Milei with Italian President Sergio Mattarella on 12 February 2024

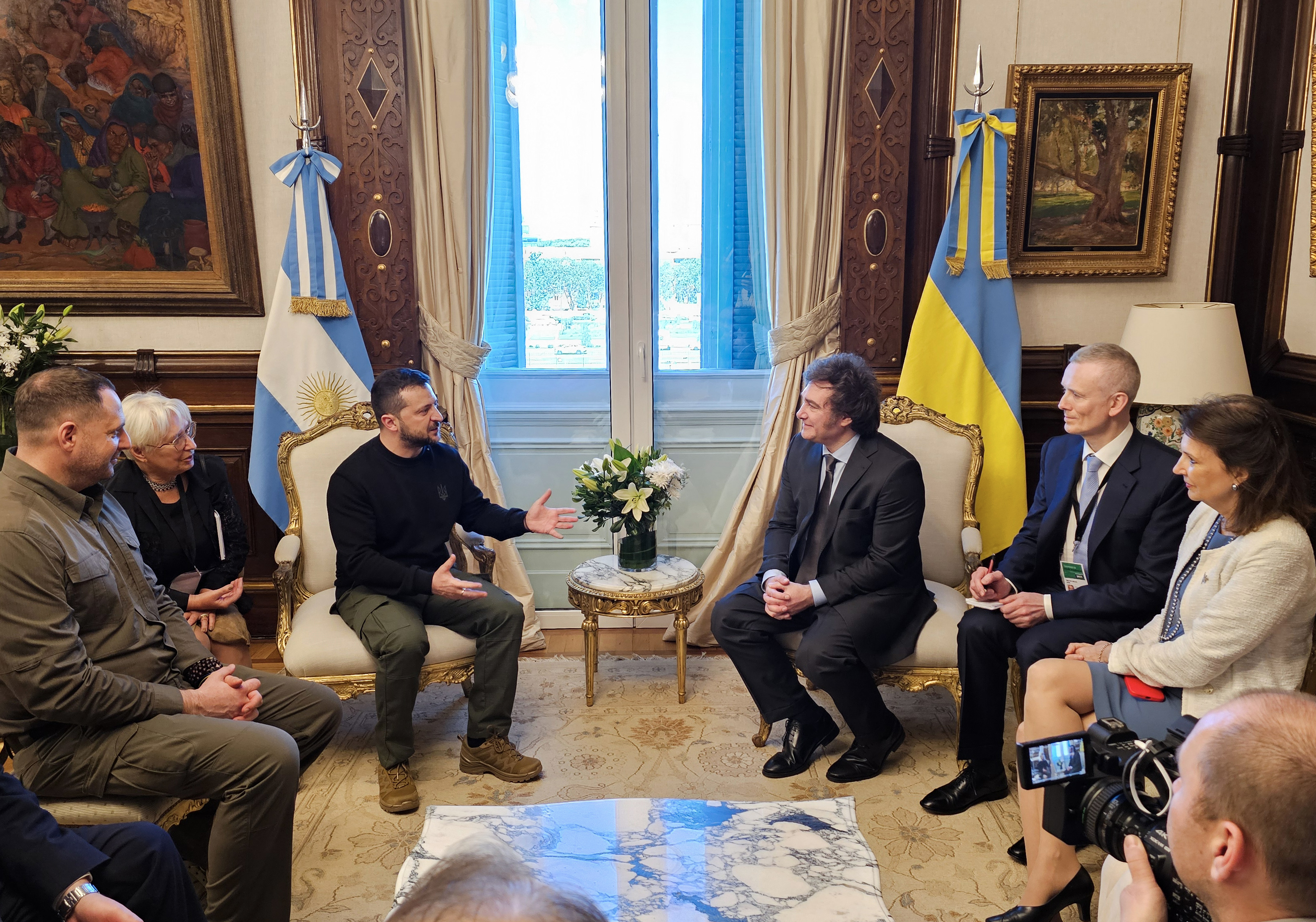
Milei and Ukrainian President Volodymyr Zelenskyy in Buenos Aires, 10 December 2023

=== International Monetary Fund ===
Argentina has failed to meet targets on cutting its fiscal deficit and building up foreign reserves under its $44 billion arrangement with the International Monetary Fund (IMF), which approved a $7.5 billion loan disbursement. In a July 2023 interview with the Financial Times about this, Milei said that, if he is elected president of Argentina, he would "overshoot all the targets" in the IMF deal, calling the required spending cuts as small compared with what he says the country needs. About the IMF, which provided Argentina with twenty-two bailouts, Milei said that it "doesn't care" about what he described as the country's deep-rooted challenges. He said: "The IMF are just a bunch of bureaucrats who know that a bank's business is to charge interest. If I'm elected it will be to solve Argentina's problems."

=== BRICS ===
In August 2023, Milei dismissed the possible Argentine participation in BRICS. He wants Argentina to pull out of the Mercosur trade bloc that includes Brazil. Argentina's place in the organisation has been strained by the Mercosur Waterways diplomatic crisis.

=== International political figures ===
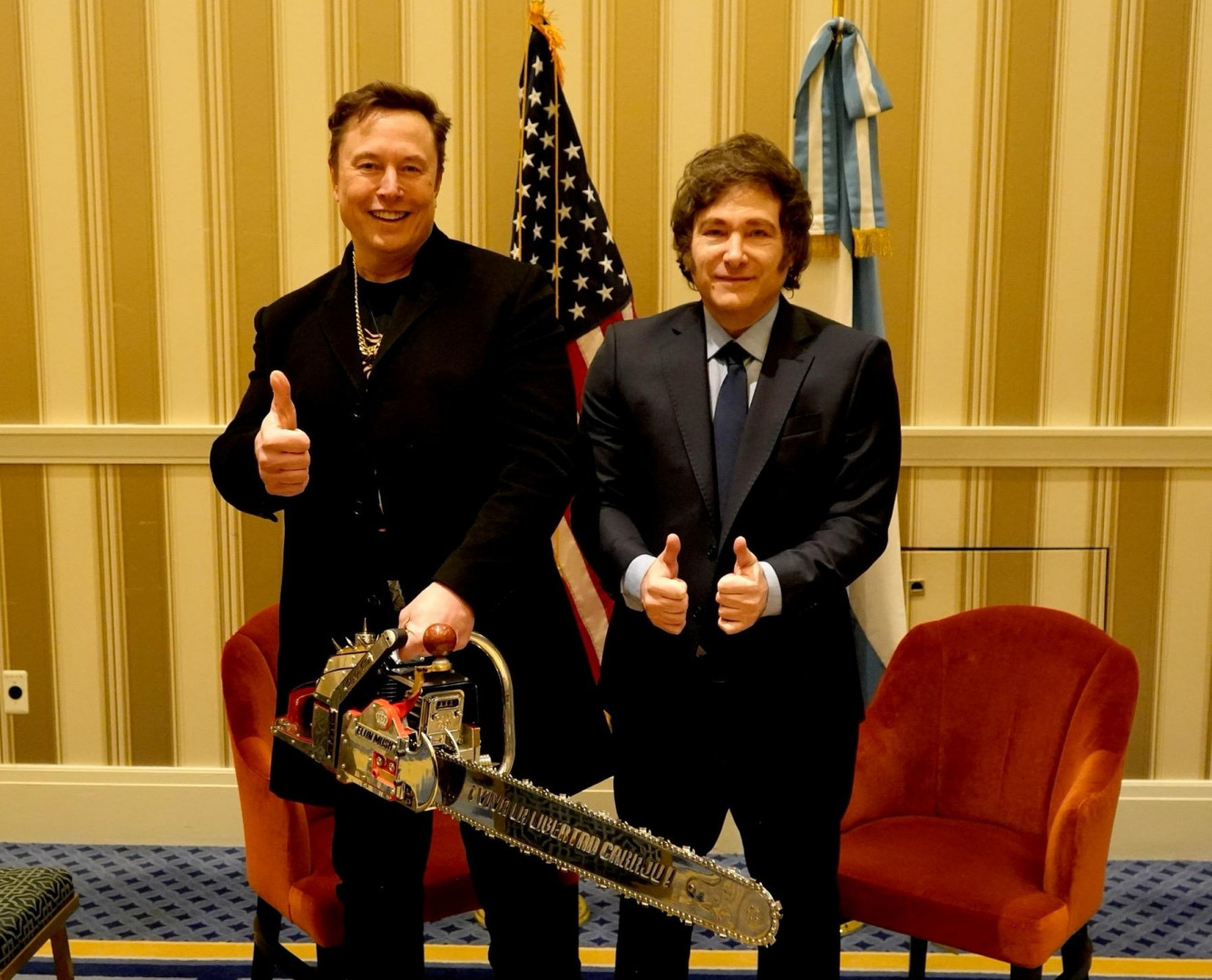
Javier Milei and Elon Musk hold a chainsaw during a meeting in National Harbor, Maryland (2025). Milei has said, "My alignment with Trump and Bolsonaro is almost natural."

Milei considers former Brazilian president Jair Bolsonaro and United States president Donald Trump as allies in his anti-communism agenda and criticism of socialism, and he has been compared to Bolsonaro for sharing an anti-leftist and anti-social justice platform. When asked about Trump and Bolsonaro, he said: "I have a clear agenda, which goes against everything that is socialism or communism. Everyone who is against socialism or communism is on the side I am on. This is my guiding principle, then we can have all the differences you want. In that group we have liberals, libertarians, people from the centre, conservatives, from the centre-right, but the limit is that no one crosses the limit of social democracy and all expressions further to the left. My alignment with Trump and Bolsonaro is almost natural."

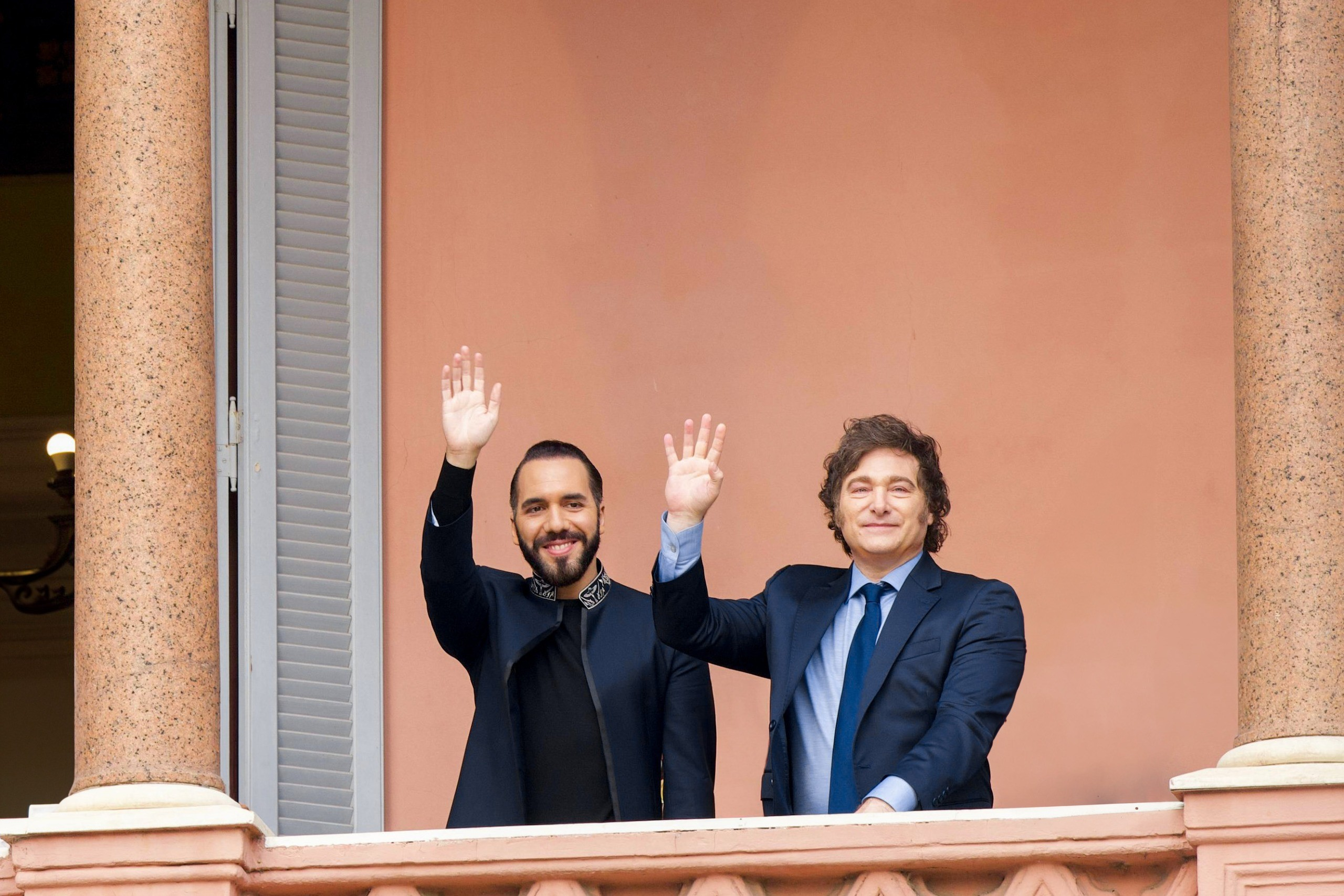
Javier Milei and Nayib Bukele.

Milei is supportive of the heavy-handed policy undertaken by Nayib Bukele in El Salvador. While taking a prudent approach, without ruling the model outright, he stated: "In principle, we say that we have to study it and what Nahuel [Sotelo, deputy] did was go to study it [in El Salvador]. We are studying it because it was extremely successful."

Milei has expressed praise for former British Prime Minister Margaret Thatcher and cited Thatcherism as an influence, a stance that caused controversy with Falklands War veterans in Argentina due to her association with the sinking of the ARA General Belgrano. Milei also argued that the political left in Argentina have more of an issue with Thatcher over her role in opposing socialism in Eastern Europe and in 2023 compared the Falklands War and Thatcher to French footballer Kylian Mbappe who played against Argentina during the 2022 Football World Cup. When challenged about his views on Thatcher by his 2023 presidential opponent Sergio Massa during a televised debate, Milei referred to Thatcher and United States president Ronald Reagan as one of "the great leaders in the history of humanity" for their role in the fall of the Berlin Wall and opposing communism in Europe. When asked whether he still supported Thatcher during an interview with the BBC in 2024, Milei responded with “Criticising someone because of their nationality or race is very intellectually precarious. I have heard lots of speeches by Margaret Thatcher. She was brilliant. So what's the problem?”

=== Madrid Charter ===
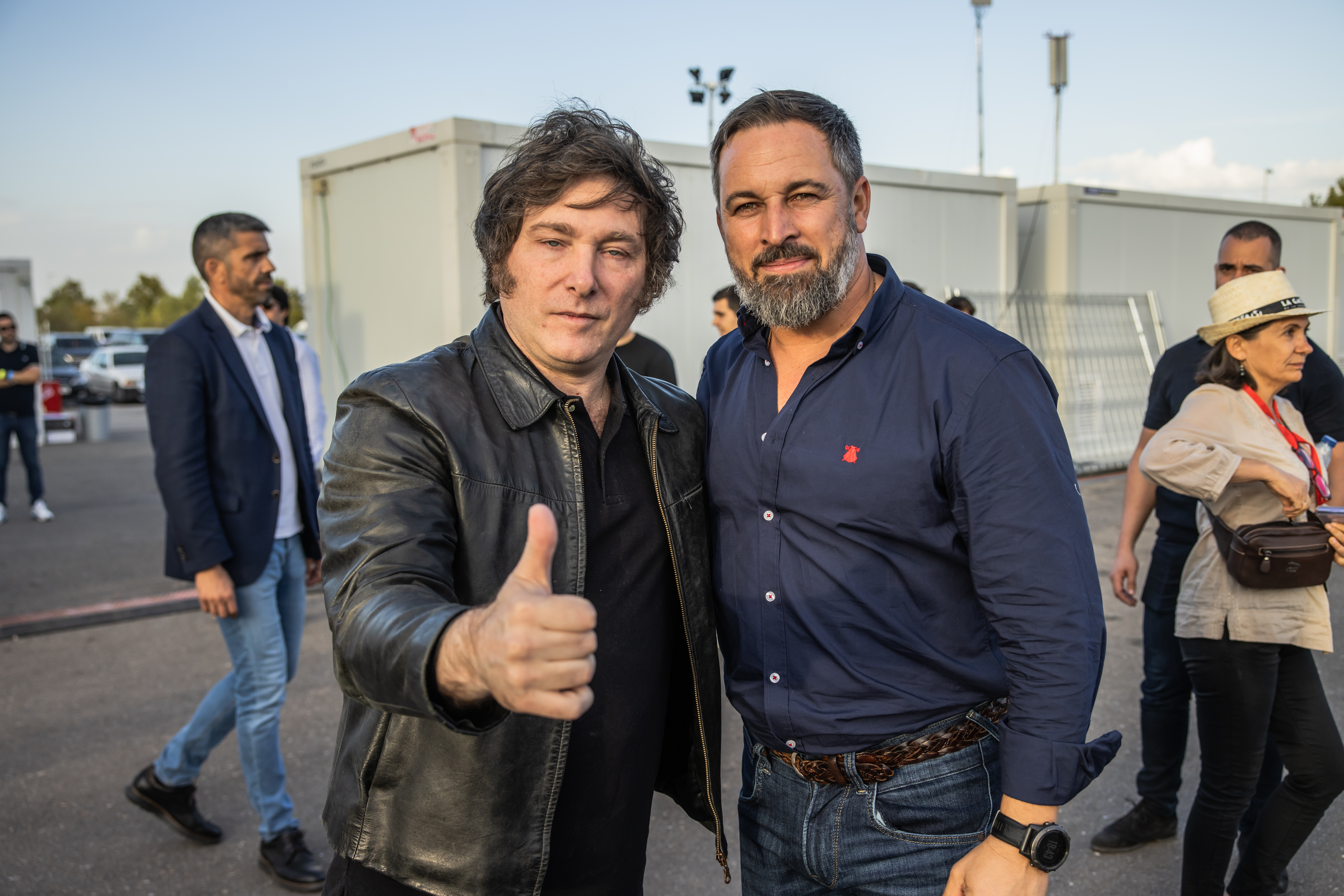
Milei with Spanish Vox leader Santiago Abascal, 2022

Milei endorses the Madrid Charter, a document drafted by Vox that characterizes left-wing groups, such as the São Paulo Forum and the Puebla Group, as enemies of Ibero-America, and accuses them of engaging in "a criminal project under the umbrella of the Cuban regime" that "seeks to destabilize liberal democracies and the state of law". He signed the document alongside other far-right politicians across the region, including Eduardo Bolsonaro from Brazil, Rafael López Aliaga from Peru, and José Antonio Kast from Chile.

=== United States and Israel ===
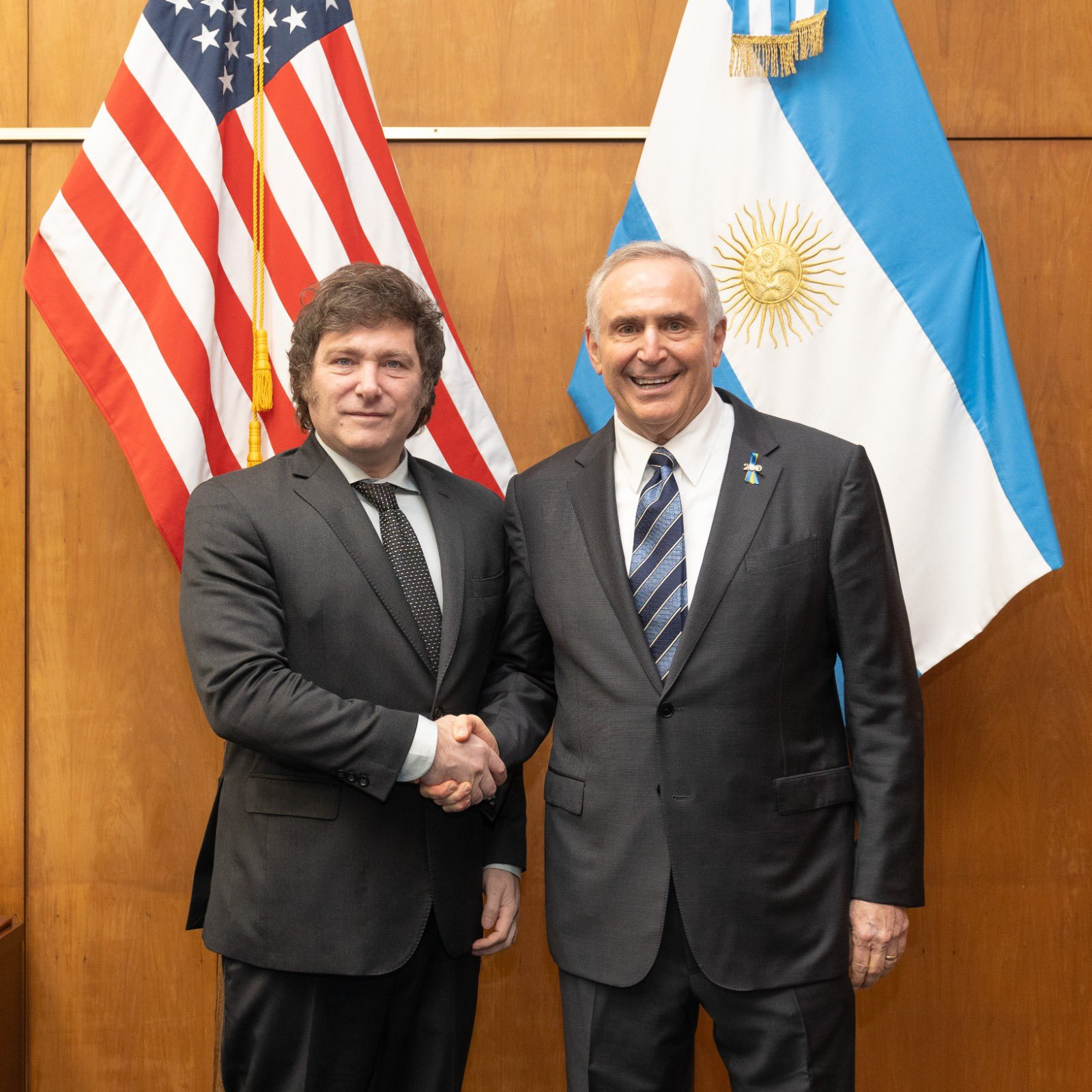
Milei with the United States ambassador to Argentina Marc Stanley, 26 September 2023

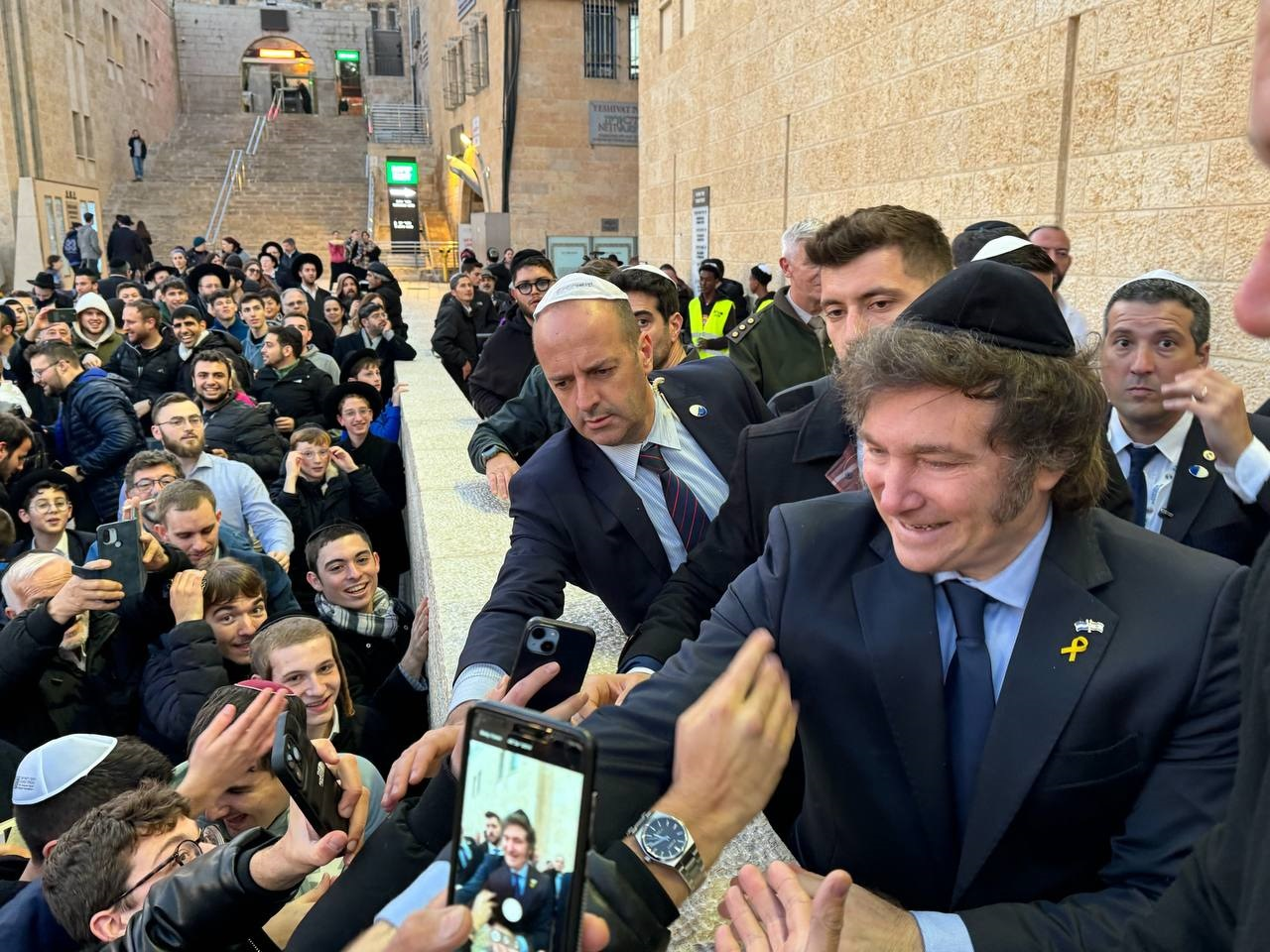
Milei at the Western Wall in Jerusalem on 6 February 2024

Milei is pro-Israel and pro-United States, and stated that they would be Argentina's primary allies if elected president. He also expressed his intention to relocate the Argentine embassy in Israel from Tel Aviv to Jerusalem. During his 2023 presidential campaign, Milei often waved an Israeli flag. Shortly after winning the election in November 2023, Milei said that he would visit both the United States and Israel before his inauguration, describing the trips as having "a spiritual connotation"; he last visited the United States in August 2023, "to pray and learn about Judaism".

In April 2024, Milei promised that Argentina "will always be on [Israel's] side". He also accused the Iranian regime of "seeking the destruction of Western civilization".

Milei celebrated the 2024 Nuseirat rescue operation in Gaza on Twitter, posting, "Long live freedom, damn it!".

=== China and Russia ===
In August 2023, Milei said he would freeze relations with China. He also said: "People are not free in China, they can't do what they want and when they do it, they get killed. Would you trade with an assassin?" Analysts stated that a breakdown of Argentina–China relations could harm the Argentine economy. However, upon taking office, Milei softened his stance on China, saying that he would not touch existing trade agreements between Argentina and China. In June 2024, Argentina and China renewed their currency swap line. He later described China as a "fabulous partner", praising China for its lack of demands and stating that closer commercial ties are in Argentine interests due to Argentina and China being "complementary economies".

Milei has expressed support for Ukraine since the beginning of its invasion by Russia. In March 2022, he wore a Ukrainian flag pin in parliament and stated: "Those of us who defend the ideas of freedom cannot tolerate or accept an invasion like Russia has done to Ukraine." He criticized the Fernández administration's position towards the war as "weak" and accused it of being "complicit with the worst dictatorships in the World". However, he has since softened his stance on Russia in line with the Trump administration in the US by avoiding to criticize Russia in the United Nations.

=== Brazil, Cuba, Iran, Nicaragua, South Africa, and Venezuela ===
Milei has been a strong critic of the governments of Cuba, Nicaragua, and Venezuela. He stated that Cuba is a "jail and a hell because of the decision of communists", and labelled Fidel Castro and the other Castros as "murderers". Milei has also referred to First Secretary of the Communist Party of Cuba Miguel Díaz-Canel as a "dictator, a drug trafficker and a terrorist", further stating during the 2021 Cuban protests that "if the regime falls, I will be part of it. I will go to the island to witness how a people liberates itself from communist oppression". In response to Venezuelan president Nicolás Maduro calling him a "far-right neo-Nazi", Milei called Venezuela "a dictatorship".

In late November 2023, Milei announced that Cuba, Nicaragua, and Venezuela, in addition to Iran, were not invited to his inauguration. In response to Milei's statements about the country, Nicaragua vacated its embassy in Argentina on 4 December 2023. Milei, who had previously labelled Nicaragua as "a dictatorship", did not invite Nicaraguan president Daniel Ortega to his inauguration.

Following his election, Milei has somewhat moderated his stance on Argentinian relations with left-wing governments, in particular that of Brazil. In an attempt to soften his image and improve relations between the two countries, Milei invited incumbent Brazilian president Luiz Inácio Lula da Silva to his inauguration. During the campaign he had insulted Da Silva as an "angry communist" and suggested he would avoid doing business with Brazil, which is Argentina's top trade partner. In December, Milei wrote a letter to Lula expressing his wish to keep sharing "complementary areas" with Brazil so that both countries can achieve "growth and prosperity", citing their trade and global footprints.

In his 2025 CPAC speech, Milei attacked the USAID agency and defined South African government as "a government with discriminatory aspirations", referring to Black Economic Empowerment and other laws which are often defined by right-wing medias as reverse racism. Milei also followed Trump's choice to boycott South Africa-lead G20 by not sending Luis Caputo to G20's finance ministers and central bank governors summit in Cape Town, this decision occurred after a meeting between the Argentinian minister and US Secretary of the Treasury Scott Bessent, who, like other US ministers, also boycotted Johannesburg G20's meetings. On 11 November 2025 was announced that President Milei himself would not attend the G20 Leaders' Summit programmed on 22 and 23 November to continue supporting the boycott towards South Africa announced by Donald Trump.

On 20 June 2025, while giving an interview, Milei stated that Iran is an enemy of Argentina, citing the past AMIA bombing terrorist attacks on Argentine soil supported by the Iranian regime. Milei celebrated Israeli strikes on Iran, stating that "today is a great day for Western civilization".

=== Falklands Islands dispute ===
As a proponent of non-interventionism in foreign politics, Milei criticized the Falklands War. About this, he said that a government led by him would advocate for dialogue; at the same time, he admitted that this task "is complicated". He added: "If you want [the islands] to become part of Argentina one day again, it will involve a very, very long negotiation and where Argentina will have to be able to propose something interesting ... You will have to sit down and talk to the United Kingdom and discuss this situation with those who live on the islands." His praise of Margaret Thatcher, the prime minister of the United Kingdom at the time of the Falklands War, attracted criticism in a country where she is widely unpopular, particularly among Falklands veterans.

During his presidential campaign, Milei stated that Argentina has sovereignty over Falklands, which he described as "non-negotiable", and added he would not use military force to take the islands, stating: "We had a war – that we lost – and now we have to make every effort to recover the islands through diplomatic channels." He also said that any negotiations over the islands should include the people who live there because, in his own words, "they live like in a developed country, and not in a miserable country as we [Argentina] have." He suggested that one such proposal would be a similar one country, two systems model Britain and China agreed on prior to the handover of Hong Kong.

In a May 2024 interview with the BBC News Milei said that he accepted the current status of the Falkland Islands as a British territory and responded to then British foreign secretary David Cameron's statement that the sovereignty of the islands were not up for negotiation by saying “If that territory is now in the hands of the UK, he has a right to do that. I don’t see that as a provocation.” Milei stated that his stance on the Falklands was different compared to previous Argentinian leaders who “beat their chests demanding sovereignty of the islands, but without any result” and summarized his position as “we are not going to relinquish our sovereignty, nor are we going to seek conflict with the United Kingdom" and reiterated that he seeks to claim the islands for Argentina through "long-term negotiation" over violence.

=== International organizations ===
Milei holds right-wing antiglobalism views on the United Nations programs, including the Sustainable Development Goals part of the 2030 Agenda for Sustainable Development. Milei also is a critic of the Paris Agreement, evaluating the exit of Argentina.

== See also ==
- Inauguration of Javier Milei
- Javier Milei 2023 presidential campaign
- Public image of Javier Milei
