= Javier Milei 2023 presidential campaign =

Campaign for president of Argentina by Libertarian Party member Javier Milei

- Campaign: 2023 Argentine general election
- Candidate: Javier Milei (National Deputy from the City of Buenos Aires, 2021–2023); Victoria Villarruel (National Deputy from the City of Buenos Aires, 2021–2023)
- Affiliation: Libertarian Party; La Libertad Avanza (alliance)
- Status: Announced: 11 June 2022; Won primary election: 13 August 2023; Advanced to second round of general election: 22 October 2023; Won second round: 19 November 2023; Inaugurated: 10 December 2023
- Key people: Karina Milei (manager)
- Slogan(s): La unica solución ("The only solution")

Website
- milei2023.com.ar

In the 2023 Argentine presidential election, Javier Milei and Victoria Villarruel were respectively elected president and vice president of Argentina, defeating peronists Sergio Massa and Agustín Rossi (of the Union for the Homeland) 55.7% to 44.3% of the votes. It was the highest percentage of the vote since Argentina's transition to democracy. Milei and Villarruel took office on 10 December 2023. Their victory represented a significant political upheaval in Argentina, challenging the traditional political dynamics and signaling a new era in Argentine politics characterized by radical changes and uncertainties. Milei's campaign and eventual victory in particular were subject to intense scrutiny and analysis both nationally and internationally, (Note: Milei's political positions have sparked controversy and confusion. Some of his proposals, such as his support for same-sex marriage in Argentina and drug legalization, were contrasted to his more conservative policies. Controversial were his opposition to abortion in rape cases, his view of comprehensive sex education in schools as a form of brainwashing, skepticism towards COVID-19 vaccines, civilian firearm ownership support, legalization of organ trade, promotion of the far-right Cultural Marxism conspiracy theory, and climate change denial. Due to those controversies and his radical conservative social and economic policies, his victory in the primaries was deemed an upset, which foresaw his subsequent victory in the 2023 general elections, and led to his description as a far-right populist and libertarian, among other labels.) as he was variously described as a far-right populist, right-wing libertarian, ultraconservative, and political outsider by major news outlets across the globe, and compared to both Donald Trump and Jair Bolsonaro, among others.

In the politically turbulent landscape of Argentina, Milei, a former goalkeeper, rockstar, and economist-turned politician, emerged as a controversial and polarizing figure in the 2023 presidential election. Representing the Libertarian Party as the presidential candidate of La Libertad Avanza, Milei's campaign was marked by a blend of populist and economic libertarian ideologies, (Note: A self-declared practical minarchist or liberal-libertarian, Milei said he adhered ideologically to the philosophy of anarcho-capitalism. Regarding economic matters, he has been described as an ultra-liberal, being aligned with the Austrian School, and he contend that Argentina is a tax hell. He also advocated for a swift reduction in government spending to achieve a balanced budget. Adopting populist rhetoric, Milei gained widespread recognition through regular television appearances where he criticized the administrations of Cristina Fernández de Kirchner, Mauricio Macri, and Alberto Fernández, citing what he saw as their rampant spending and a lack of fiscal adjustment as concerns. Due to his economic proposals, Milei was described as a radical libertarian.) which he staunchly defended against the far-right label given by international news media. Villarruel, the vice-presidential running mate, exerted some significant influence on Milei despite some differences of views, and attracted attention and controversy due to her connections and historical revisionist views regarding the National Reorganization Process, for which she has been described as an ultraconservative.

Amidst an economic backdrop of rising interest rates and volatility, Milei's ascent in Argentine politics was seen as a reaction to the frustrations with both Peronist and non-Peronist governments. His surprising victory in the August 2023 Argentine primary elections, followed by success in the October 2023 general elections, reflected a significant shift in the Argentine political landscape. Milei's advocacy for the abolition of the Central Bank of Argentina and the adoption of dollarization were met with criticism but underscored the radical nature of his economic policies. His foreign policy and social views were also seen as radical. (Note: On social issues, such as abortion and euthanasia, Milei expressed his moral opposition to them. Seeing it as a property issue, he argued that abortion is morally wrong even in cases of rape. He opposed the law that legalized it in 2020, and proposed to hold a referendum about the Voluntary Interruption of Pregnancy Bill. Additionally, he criticized comprehensive sex education in schools, supported the education voucher system, wanted to restrict immigration, criticized the handling of the COVID-19 pandemic in Argentina, and proposed to legalize the sale of human organs. He was described as a radical conservative. His foreign policy views, which included exiting BRICS and breakdown relations with China, were also seen as radical.)

Launched in June 2022, Milei's campaign gained momentum as Argentina grappled with soaring inflation, exceeding 100% in May 2023. His radical proposals, including the free sale of firearms and human organs and the repeal of Argentina's abortion law, sparked widespread controversy and debate. His stance against the law that legalized abortion in 2020 was particularly contentious, as he proposed a referendum to potentially revoke it. Besides his August 2023 primary elections win being deemed a major election upset, it brought him to international attention. He was considered the front-runner going into the general election, where it was thought he would further improve his primaries margins and even win in the first round; the October 2023 results showed an underperformance from Milei, who maintained his voting percentage from the primaries, with Massa surprisingly coming up on top in what was seen as a backlash against Milei and his politics. Thus, the polls for the November 2023 runoff showed a tight race that would be decided by undecided voters. Ultimately, Milei won in a landslide victory and became the president of Argentina. Observers generally saw Milei's win more as a discontent for the status quo rather than support for his politics.

== Background ==
Milei began his political career in 2021, when he was elected to the position of national deputy (a member of the Argentine Chamber of Deputies since December 2021) in Buenos Aires, representing La Libertad Avanza, which he leads. Other than that, he had no political experience and presented himself as an outsider and anti-establishment candidate. During his 2021 election campaign as a national deputy, Milei pledged not to raise taxes and was known to raffle his salary. As a national deputy, in line with his opposition to the state, Milei had several absences and did not present any projects, was not a member of any of the 46 commissions of the lower house, and participated little in the debates that took place. He supported some bills and resolutions of his colleagues, made questions, and voted against; through his monthly salary raffle, he returned more than seven million Argentine pesos.

== Overview ==
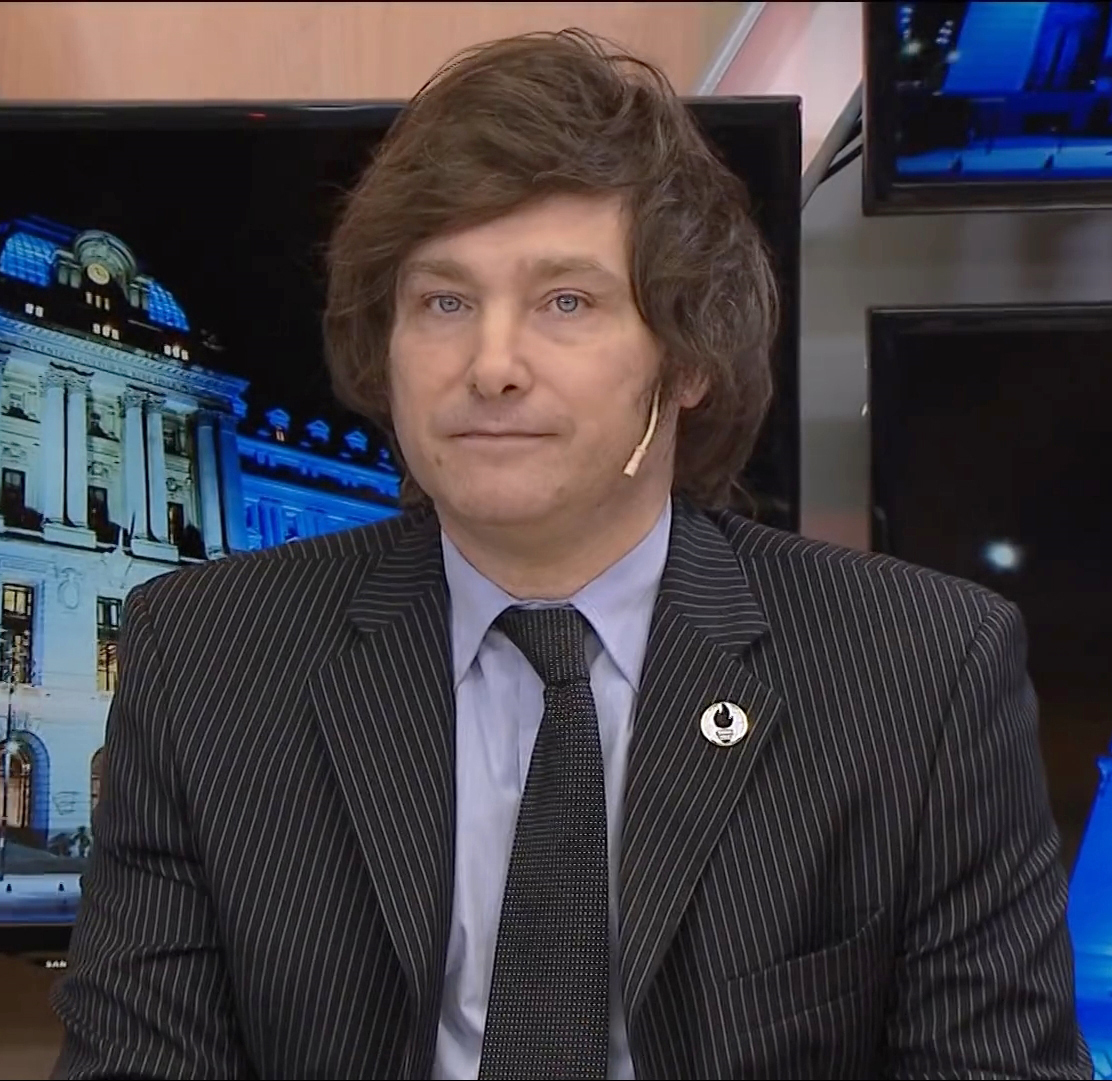
Milei, here pictured in 2019, became the president of Argentina in December 2023.

Milei identifies with anarcho-capitalism and paleolibertarianism, while being for practical reasons a minarchist; he describes himself as a liberal-libertarian. During his political campaign, commentators categorized his ideological views as a blend of populist, right-wing libertarian, and conservative strands, along with ultraliberal economics, right-wing populist, ultraconservative, and far-right politics, and representing anti-politics. He has also been variously described as a far-right populist, far-right outsider, far-right libertarian, and libertarian populist, and labelled far right or radical right by international news agencies like Al Jazeera English, the BBC, and Reuters, newspapers including The Economist, The Daily Telegraph, the Financial Times, Le Monde, The New York Times, and The Wall Street Journal, news magazines like Time, and several Argentine and Spanish-language publications including among the others El Diario, elDiario.es, El Mundo, El País, Perfil, Télam, and Tiempo Argentino. Milei rejected the use of the far-right label to describe his views, and said: "I'm a liberal and libertarian, these positions are things of the left, because for the left, everything that is not on their side is on the right."

Milei supports former Brazilian president Jair Bolsonaro and former United States president Donald Trump, especially their anti-communism and criticism of socialism, and he has been compared to them for sharing an anti-leftist and anti-social justice platform. When asked about Trump and Bolsonaro, he said: "I have a clear agenda, which goes against everything that is socialism or communism. Everyone who is against socialism or communism is on the side I am on. This is my guiding principle, then we can have all the differences you want. In that group we have liberals, libertarians, people from the center, conservatives, from the center-right, but the limit is that no one crosses the limit of social democracy and all expressions further to the left. My alignment with Trump and Bolsonaro is almost natural."

Milei's 2023 presidential campaign and August 2023 primaries win brought him international attention, as the international press widely reported on his rise in the polls and prominence and electoral upset, and used a range of labels to describe him. Due to his primaries upset win, he was described as a far-right populist or outsider. Reuters reported that Milei is a "radical right-wing candidate", Time called him a populist, El País described him as an "ultra-right libertarian and 'anarcho-capitalist' who represents angry Argentina", CNN saw him as an outsider, The Economist headlined that "Argentina could get its first libertarian president", CBC News described him as a "libertarian firebrand", and the BBC described him as a "Trump admirer". He has also been compared to American conservative Tucker Carlson, Ron DeSantis, and Marine Le Pen of France's National Rally. He maintains close ties with the Spanish far-right party Vox, from which he borrowed the anti-caste rhetoric, as well as the former far-right conservative Chilean presidential candidate José Antonio Kast. Milei said: "People realize that we're getting poorer and that the only ones making progress are the politicians, the parasites."

Commentators observed that Milei and his running mate, Victoria Villarruel, held differences on certain issues. Milei does not oppose the 2010 law that legalized same-sex marriage in Argentina, while Villarruel supports civil unions but is opposed to egalitarian marriage, and disagrees with him on questions like organ trade legalization, on the grounds that the human body is not a good; their differences of views have been explained as philosophical issues due to Milei's economist background. They also held different views on the National Reorganization Process and the Dirty War. Villarruel is the daughter of a military personnel and engages in historical revisionist accounts of the military dictatorship, and has been accused of Argentine state terrorism denial. While Milei publicly expressed that he is not a defender of it, he has attracted controversy for having questioned the 30,000 disappeared toll. Observers also pointed to the influence Villarruel ultimately had on Milei.

== Presidential ticket ==
The only solution
| Javier Milei | Victoria Villarruel |
| for President | for Vice President |
| National Deputy (2021–2023) | National Deputy (2021–2023) |
Coalition parties: Libertarian Party; National Democratic Party; Democratic Party

== Campaign ==
A member of the Libertarian Party, Milei was the candidate for president of Argentina as part of La Libertad Avanza. His running mate for vice president of Argentina was Victoria Villarruel, the daughter of a military personnel who has engaged in historical revisionist accounts of the military dictatorship, and has been accused of Argentine state terrorism denial. Milei announced his candidacy in an April 2022 interview with Clarín. Milei's campaign, which was managed by his sister Karina, officially began in a June 2022 event that was deemed a fiasco due to low attendance.

As inflation rose above 100% in May 2023, Milei's position in the polls increased. During the campaign for the 2023 Argentine primary elections, Milei generated controversy after he suggested that he would allow the free sale of firearms and human organs, as well as criticism for his comments deemed to be mysoginistic. Furthermore, he intends to revoke the law (Voluntary Interruption of Pregnancy Bill) that legalized abortion in Argentina, which was approved in 2020, and is against its decriminalization. In an August 2023 interview with Alejandro Fantino, he suggested holding a referendum to do so, saying: "Just because something is legal, it does not mean that it is legitimate. I am against it (the Voluntary and Legal Interruption of Pregnancy Bill) because it is against the right to life. ... At least I would hold a referendum. And, if the result is in my favor, the law is eliminated. But let the Argentines choose. Let's see if the Argentines believe in the murder of a defenseless human in the womb of the mother." Gun laws in Argentina are restrictive. According to his party's electoral platform, Milei proposes the "deregulation of the legal market" for weapons and "the protection of its legitimate and responsible use by the citizens".

Milei's rise has been described within the context of the last two presidencies. Analysts described a win for Milei as a more dramatic version of the pro-business government of former president Mauricio Macri, who tried to introduce market reforms after taking office in 2015 only to clash to the political opposition and plunge headlong into a financial crisis that ended with the country asking the International Monetary Fund for another rescue package. Alberto Fernández, Macri's successor, has struggled to fix the economy amid the COVID-19 pandemic in Argentina and a severe shortage of foreign currency, leaving the country vulnerable to another debt default. Fernández is so unpopular that he decided not to run for re-election. In August 2023, Milei stated that he would not end social programs, which support millions of people in a country where almost 40% of the population is impoverished; he described them as "victims, not victimizers". He added that ending this type of social assistance would take up to fifteen years.

Milei, alongside Villarruel, was ultimately the successful presidential ticket in the November 2023 Argentine general election, Milei had achieved a significant victory in the August 2023 primary elections, emerging as the top-voted candidate in a major election upset. His proposed abolition of the Central Bank of Argentina and dollarization, based on advices from economists Emilio Ocampo and Nicolás Cachanosky who had approached Milei to determine the best path towards dollarization, proved to be controversial and met criticism; the Argentine peso plunged and interest rates were raised as a result of his primaries win. Analysts had observed that a better-than-expected showing for Milei in the primaries would have likely upset financial markets and lead to a sharp plunge for the Argentine peso's amid uncertainty about the economic policies he might implement if elected president. During the electoral campaign, his critics often pointed to Milei's controversial pronouncements, which have been described as being part of an outlandish and bizarre behavior, to argue about his incompetency to rule.

=== 2023 primary elections ===
In the August 2023 primary elections, which are seen as an indication of how citizens are likely to vote in the October 2023 Argentine general election, Milei emerged as the leading presidential candidate, with 30% of the votes, ahead of the traditional Peronism–Kirchnerism and Macrism that dominated the country in the 2010s. Opinion polling for the 2023 Argentine general election had predicted that the economy minister Sergio Massa of the Union for the Homeland would secure the most votes as a candidate in the primaries, with Juntos por el Cambio expected to be the most voted coalition overall; Milei was polled at about 20% but achieved 30%, and was seen as an outsider candidate. In June 2023, the markets welcomed Massa's presidential candidacy, as it polarized the election between the ruling party and Juntos por el Cambio, reducing what was called the "Milei factor". Javier Timerman, Managing Partner of Adcap Grupo Financiero, said on CCN Radio that "Javier Milei has always been a source of fear and uncertainty for foreign investors, both financial and investor in the real economy."

Milei's win marked the first time an economics right candidate won the primary elections since the 1916 Argentine general election. Initially, for the first round of the general election in October 2023, with the possibility of a run-off election in November 2023, far left Peronists saw Milei as a possible ally who would divide the votes of the centre-right coalition. During the night of celebration, Milei danced rock and roll with his family, choosing the song "Se viene", one of Argentine rock's greatest hits that at the end of the 1990s became a challenge to the neoliberal government of Carlos Menem and was a premonition of the Corralito crisis in 2001; the song's chorus says: "The explosion is coming." Milei looks to Menem as an example and the band, Bersuit Vergarabat, had forbidden him to use the song. Despite this, the hall of celebrations sang it without fear of contradictions. He said: "This election will not only put an end to Kirchnerism, but also to the parasitic, larcenous, useless caste that is sinking the country." His win was celebrated by an economics right figures including Jair Bolsonaro, José Antonio Kast, Ted Cruz, and Vox.

For political analyst Facundo Cruz of the Research Center for Democratic Quality, this was a result of the protest vote. He said that the vote for Milei "channeled the citizen discontent of the last two governments, past and present". According to Clarín, "Milei's victory speaks to us above all of the extent of despondency and anger that hovers in Argentine society, which wanted to express this profound unease with the primary vote." According to Página12, he "arises from a bad economic situation, from the critical situations experienced during the months of isolation due to the pandemic, added to the exasperating and permanent blow of inflation." Página12 saw a similarity with the scenarios before the military coups in Argentina and other Latin American countries, saying that the military coups "have dismantled the democratic system, but they have never solved anything and, in exchange rate, have worsened the lives of Argentines: poverty, debts, unemployment and so on. Milei looks like a child of that story. He embodies the same illusions of a sector of society that promoted dictatorships and then regretted it."

=== 2023 general elections ===
==== First round ====
Due to his radical economic policies, the Argentine peso plunged as a result of his primaries win, while the official dollar exchange rate rose by 20%, and the Central Bank of Argentina raised interest rates. As a result of his strong performance in the primaries, Milei was considered the front-runner for the general election. Analysts say that this could lead to higher inflationary and foreign exchange pressures. According to the Eurasia Group analyst and Latin American researcher Luciano Sigalov, if Milei were to win the presidency, he would face governability issues due to a lack of parliamentary majority to pass the radical pro-market reforms he advocates, and may result in street resistance and protest from Peronist and social movements. Sigalov said: "The likely prospect of a Milei victory and the risks from his radical policy program will generate more pressures on inflation and exchange rates. The worsening economic conditions will benefit Milei as he blames [rival] politicians for the spiraling crisis."

According to JPMorgan, Milei's win was not certain and predicted a chaotic outcome, citing the historically low turnout of the primaries and that a higher-than-average turnout for the general election would benefit the traditional parties of Massa's Union for the Homeland and Patricia Bullrich's Juntos por el Cambio. Jared Lou, a portfolio manager at William Blair Investment Management, commented: "One factor that may help Milei in the presidential elections is that he's an outsider and voters are frustrated." At the same time, Lou stated that Milei's views on promoting gun ownership, anti-abortion policies, and a dollarized economy could put off voters, as he says most Argentinians oppose those policies. He added: "Many of the policies he has campaigned on are viewed as fairly radical by the electorate."

In the first round, Milei maintained his 30% of the vote achieved in the primaries and advanced to the runoff but finished second, as Massa unexpectedly came in first place, winning 36% of the vote. The results were seen as an upset because of the severe inflation that took place during Massa's tenure as the economy minister, as well as Milei's lead in polls up to that point. This prompted Milei to try to moderate his image in order to attract the more moderate voters. Lucas Romero, the head of local political consultancy Synopsis, said that Milei is "an inexperienced candidate, lacking political expertise, who perhaps may not have the capacity to understand that the current scenario will require him to moderate, build political agreements, and appeal to voters who might ask for changes in his political proposal." Despite this, Milei described these as false rumors and said that his central bank abolition proposal, which has been controversial, was "non-negotiable".

==== Second round ====
For the second round, there were around 9 million swing voters that could decide the election. Milei was also endorsed among others by Macri and Bullrich, the latter finishing third in the first round despite previously having been considered the front-runner. Whilst not surprising considering their shared right-wing politics and opposition to Kirchnerism, their endorsement attracted attention due to Milei's past comments about them, and Macri in particular being seen as part of the establishment propping up the self-declared anti-establishment Milei to win; these endorsements were seen as a risky gamble. Milei had variously called Macri a coward, a fascist, and a socialist, while Bullrich had sued him for defamation after Milei pointed to her guerrilla past, accusing her of "planting bombs in kindergartens". Additionally, Bullrich's backing of Milei caused some tension and criticism within her coalition.

In the runoff, Milei defeated Massa with 55.7% of the vote, the highest percentage of the vote since Argentina's transition to democracy. In a surprise reversal of the first round, Milei outperformed polls, which had been calling a much closer race. Massa conceded defeat shortly before the official results were published, and Milei is scheduled to be sworn in as the next president of Argentina on 10 December 2023. Milei's win marked an end to Argentine's political system that saw an hegemony between Peronism, which dominated the country since the 1940s in both left-wing and right-wing incarnations, and its main conservative opposition. Julio Burdman, director of the consultancy Observatorio Electoral, commented: "The election marks a profound rupture in the system of political representation in Argentina."

==== Aftermath ====
Observers generally saw Milei's win a result of discontent with the previous governments and the status quo rather than support for Milei's politics, actions, and rhetoric during the election campaign, which included wielding a chainsaw on stage, smashing a piñata on air to symbolize his plans, calling Pope Francis "a filthy leftist", and praising American gangster Al Capone as "a hero". Local political consultant Lucas Romero told the Associated Press: "This is a triumph that is less due to Milei and his peculiarities and particularities and more to the demand for change."

Milei's win was placed within the contest of an outsider with radical views trying to fix an Argentine economy, which is South America's second largest economy, that has been battered by triple-digit inflation, a looming recession, and rising poverty; Milei's challenges includes government coffers that are in the red, a $44 billion debt programme with the International Monetary Fund, and inflation at 150 percent at the time of his election but predicted to further rise to 200%. Additionally, Milei will face an hostile National Congress of Argentina, which observers said it is something he would have to struggle with and negotiate with the same politicians he attacked during his political campaign, and that this would force Milei to moderate his views. William Jackson, Chief Emerging Markets Economist at Capital Economics, wrote: "We suspect that some of his more radical proposals – namely dollarization – may not materialize given limited support both in congress and among the public."

Filipe Campante, an expert in Latin American politics at Johns Hopkins University, commented: "I think his election reflects a disastrous government that was nevertheless strong enough, due to the deep roots of Peronism, to reach the runoff, and thus allow an outsider such as Milei to become the one standard bearer for the entirely justifiable desire for change." About Milei's economic policies and challenges as president, Campante said: "He seems attached to economic ideas that are very risky, to say the least – eg dollarization. If he doubles down on them, things risk going very badly. If he changes course and chooses a more orthodox and conciliatory approach, then things could be better, but oftentimes characters like him are unable to choose a moderate path." Argentinian researchers were also said to have been "extremely worrying" by Milei's election due to some of his policies, which they consider to be anti-scientific. Milei had promised to slash research funding and shut down key science agencies.

The inauguration of Milei and Villarruel as Argentina's president and vice-president took place on 10 December 2023. In his address to the nation, Milei warned the country of an economic shock.

== Political views and positions ==
=== Economics ===
While theoretically an anarcho-capitalist, Milei identifies in the short term as a minarchist, liberal-libertarian, or classical liberal. He explained that he is an "anarcho-capitalist, because the state is the enemy. But you live in the real world and you have to have your feet on the ground. In this context, I am a minarchist – that is, someone who believes that the state should only be in charge of security and justice." He said that the state should be concerned only with administering justice and guaranteeing security. Milei aligns with economic liberalism and fiscal conservatism, often referencing the economic policies of Carlos Menem, who served as Argentina's president from 1989 to 1999, and his economy minister Domingo Cavallo; he described them as the "best economic government in Argentine history". Additionally, he upholds the ideals of Juan Bautista Alberdi and his constitution, and defended Alberto Benegas Lynch as "the greatest hero of the ideas of freedom", and the Generation of '80. Milei envisions eventually dismantling the state and the Central Bank of Argentina, which he described as "one of the greatest thieves in the history of mankind", allowing citizens to freely select their monetary system, including the potential adoption of a dollarized economy, to combat the country's inflationary issues; he says they are made worse by the Central Bank of Argentina, which he accuses of stealing money from Argentines through inflation. About the convertibility plan of the 1990s, Milei said: "Convertibility was launched on [1 April] 1991. By January of 1993, we were the country with the lowest inflation in the world. I propose the free competition of currencies, full reform of the financial system. Thus, the most probable thing is that Argentines choose the dollar."

Milei pledged to a sharp cut in government spending; he proposes a sharp economic shock to reduce inflation and the Argentine economy's issues, and to pay the country's debt. He said: "Central banks are divided in four categories: the bad ones, like the Federal Reserve, the very bad ones, like the ones in Latin America, the horribly bad ones, and the Central Bank of Argentina." Milei supports privatizing state-owned enterprises, including shale driller YPF, public services like health care and education, and roads, and pledged to scrap soy taxes and ditch electric-vehicle battery bid as part of his deregulation program. He also articulated his intention to either shut down, privatize, or redefine the National Scientific and Technical Research Council, while shutting down or merging most governmental ministries, including the Ministry of Education, the Ministry of Social Development, and the Ministry of Health, and reduce them from 18 to 8. A video of him tearing cards from a wallboard with the names of ministries that he wants to abolish and tossing them into the air went viral. In the video, he says: "The state is not the solution. It is the problem." He is opposed to trade unions, and described the Article 14 of the Argentine Constitution, which guarantees labor rights, pensions, and the entire social security system, as the country's cancer; he pledged to repeal it as president.

Milei promises to balance the budget. Argentina has failed to meet targets on cutting its fiscal deficit and building up foreign reserves under its $44 billion arrangement with the International Monetary Fund (IMF), which approved a $7.5 billion loan disbursement. In a July 2023 interview with the Financial Times about this, Milei said that if is elected president of Argentina, he would "overshoot all the targets" in the IMF deal, calling the required spending cuts as small compared with what he says the country needs. About the IMF, which provided Argentina with twenty-two bailouts, Milei said that it "doesn't care" about what he described as the country's deep-rooted challenges. He said: "The IMF are just a bunch of bureaucrats who know that a bank's business is to charge interest. If I'm elected it will be to solve Argentina's problems." According to his adviser Darío Epstein, Milei pledges to balance the budget within three months. Epstein said: "The first thing we have to do is to lower the fiscal deficit by 5 percentage points, which is not at all easy. As Argentina is in a very critical situation, with 40 to 45 per cent poverty, what we can't do is to fire people from the public sector or lower social spending. That is very important."

=== Capitalism, socialism, and communism ===
Milei promotes capitalism, and strongly opposes communism and socialism. In a TEDx presentation that went viral on social media in February 2019, Milei presented what he described as "a love story" about capitalism, arguing how capitalism and the free market have lifted people out of poverty. He then cited what he describes as myths regarding capitalism, rejecting the idea that the Nordic model is socialist, and saying that the Nordic countries are "more pro-market than people think". He labelled the problem of social inequality as a "lying hoax", and said that "social justice is unfair". He concluded that this was a debate about values, where socialism embodies envy, resentment, and coercion, while capitalism or liberalism stands for the unrestricted respect for the life project of fellow individuals. More than Karl Marx, Milei has identified John Maynard Keynes as his greatest ideological adversary, and has accused Keynes of being the main culprit for all of Argentina's ills.

While Milei was ultimately able to attract a wide range of disaffected electors, many of the people initially drawn in by him were right-wingers who are attracted to his anti-leftist and opposition to government policies, including legalizing abortion and creating a quota for trans people in government jobs. In an interview in November 2020, Milei said: "I hate communists, shitty left-wingers, because they hate life. ... [It is] a filthy system, which fails everywhere. In every place where it was applied, it generated misery and hunger." He further stated that there are only two systems, liberalism or communism, as he believes that any intermediate solution would result in a drift towards communism. In 2021, he signed a letter sponsored by Vox that railed against "the advance of communism" in the Spanish-speaking world, and was endorsed by Eduardo Bolsonaro and José Antonio Kast. In October 2021, he reiterated his anti-leftist views, saying: "I will ally with all those who believe that the left is the enemy." During his political campaign, Milei criticized Brazil and China, and said that he would not deal with those he deems to be communists.

=== Libertarianism ===
In 2021, Milei defined himself thusly: "I am a libertarian liberal. Philosophically, I am a market anarchist." His libertarianism is distinct from classical libertarianism or left-libertarianism, which originated from the French libertaire, or libertario in Spanish, which is used as a synonym for anarchism, libertarian socialism, and other left-wing philosophies, and is closer to modern libertarianism in the United States, or right-libertarianism, although those libertarians reject the left–right political spectrum. According to David Boaz, former vice president of the Cato Institute, modern libertarianism is a philosophical current within politics that places "individual freedom as the supreme political value". He wrote: "A libertarian admits that people can justifiably be forced to do certain things, the most obvious being refraining from infringing on the freedom of others. However, a libertarian considers it unacceptable that anyone can be forced to serve others, even if it is for their own good." Because those libertarians promotes the free market, defends private property, and support a small and limited state, they have been placed on the right wing of the political spectrum. Boaz said that those libertarians "have attempted to define the proper scope of individual liberty in terms of the notion of personal ownership, or self-ownership, which implies that each individual is entitled to exclusive control of his choices, actions, and body."

Milei's stances on social issues, such as abortion, are the main reason why political commentators and other libertarians do not consider him truly a libertarian. Among libertarians, some described him as a libertarian for his overall economic libertarian or neoliberal stances, and rejected comparisons to Trump and Bolsonaro, while others cited the issue of abortion as a reason not to call him a libertarian. Milei said: "I am against abortion because I believe in the life project of others. The woman can choose about her body, but what she has inside her womb is not her body, it is another individual." In response, Carmen Beatriz Fernández, an expert in political communication, stated that Milei is not libertarian but a "neopopulist or right-wing authoritarian". Guillermo Tell Aveledo, a political scientist and dean of the Faculty of Legal and Political Studies of the Metropolitan University of Caracas, said: "His criticisms on issues such as budgets and specific policies, both in his time as a commentator on television programs and now as a congressman, have been directed at the size and action of the state, so he fits the profile of a libertarian." At the same time, he agreed that Milei's conservative positions and other contradictions prevented him from being considered a "genuine libertarian". As a result, he argued that "paleolibertarian (conservative libertarian)" or "anarcho-capitalist", namely someone who believes in a form of stateless free-market capitalism, or that society can be organized and function only with the market without the need for the state, are more appropriate labels to describe Milei's politics.

The main sources of this modern type of libertarianism are Montesquieu, John Locke, Adam Smith, and the Founding Fathers of the United States, among other figures the Age of Enlightenment and part of what those libertarians consider to be classical liberalism. In addition to those historical figures questioning the role of monarchs and clergy, this current also sought to limit the powers of democratic and representative governments. About the state, which he considers an enemy, Milei promised a total reform, and stated: "The state is the greatest enemy of wealth. If the increase in its size is financed with taxes, the real wage falls. If it is with debt, they are future taxes. And if that debt is external, it raises the equilibrium exchange rate with respect to wages and makes food more expensive, creating more poor people." About taxes and liberalism, he said: "I consider the state as an enemy; taxes are a hindrance to slavery. Liberalism was created to free people from the oppression of monarchs; in this case, it would be the state." Due to his economic views, he has been described as an ultraliberal. Among his many phrases are "The state is the problem, not the solution", or that the state is "the source of Argentina's decline". He also defined taxes as "a hindrance of slavery", affirmed that only liberalism would be able to free Argentines from what he describes as the oppression of the state, compared this to the end of absolutism in European history, and reduced the basic rights to those of "Life, liberty, and property". After winning the 2023 primaries, Milei announced what he called a "new liberal revolution" and "the end of the caste model, that atrocity that says that where there is a need, a right is born, but it is forgotten that someone has to pay for that right."

=== Social issues ===
Milei opposes abortion rights, and has publicly affirmed a staunch anti-abortion stance, saying that abortion violates the non-aggression principle; he sees it as a property conflict or issue of ownership, and drew comparisons between abortion and theft. When questioned in September 2021 by a O Globo journalist about an abortion case involving the rape of a 10-year-old girl, Milei asserted that an abortion in such circumstances would still constitute murder. In October 2021, he said: "Why is one crime compensated with another crime?" He stated his support for legal abortion only when the mother's life is at risk. About this, he said that, if he is elected president, he would propose to hold a referendum about the law that legalized abortion in 2020, and, in such a case, he said that he would support its repeal. He said: "When you construct on the basis of an incorrect moral principle, the result is filth. How can being able to kill other human beings be a right gained? As a liberal, I believe in the unrestricted right to life based on the defence of life, liberty, and property. I defend life, biology says that life begins with conception." He also opposes euthanasia. Due to his views about abortion, alongside a crackdown on crime and prohibition of the use of inclusive language, he has been described as socially conservative.

Milei spoke in favor of a legal organ trade, seeing as a way to reduce waiting lists for organ transplants, and said that there could be market mechanisms to encourage organ donors. He said: "If women can have control over their bodies, why not everybody else?" In a June 2022 interview, when asked about his stance on the sale of children, Milei initially said that "it depends". In the same interview, he said: "If I had a child, I wouldn't sell them, but that's not the current topic of discussion in Argentine society. Maybe it will be in 200 years, I don't know." Due to the ensuing controversy, he later clarified his position and expressed his opposition to it. He explained his opposition in clearer terms, while separating it from the organ trade legalization as "a different discussion", stating: "Obviously, I do not agree with the sale of children." Milei supports drug legalization within the context of what he calls a free society but once warned: "If you want to commit suicide, I don't have any problem. Drugging is committing suicide in rates. If you want to get high, do whatever you want, but don't ask me to pay the bill. Because if you are not going to take charge of your decisions... well, that seems unfair to me." About prostitution in Argentina that legalized it but organized activities remain illegal, he said: "I don't see anything wrong with paying for sex. It's a free transaction."

Milei said that he has no issues with same-sex marriage and is indifferent to it; he sees marriage as a contract and is opposed to it as an institution. On homosexuality more generally, he stated: "If you decide to be homosexual, how does that affect my life? In nothing. My liberty? In nothing. My property? In nothing. Therefore, I have nothing to say." He said that the way in which sexuality is lived "is a personal choice", and added: "I don't agree at all that homosexuality is a disease." On transgender rights, Milei said that he "does not care" about gender identification, which he compared to identifying as a cougar, "as long as you do not make me pay the bill", in reference to public funding for gender-affirming care and public education. He said: "I have no problem, but don't impose it on me by the state. Don't steal money from people to impose someone else's ideas on them. That is violent." Milei's comments and stances about transgender rights caused criticism among Argentine LGBTQ activists. In June 2022, two Avanza Libertad members of the legislative assembly of Buenos Aires Province proposed a bill to ban inclusive language at schools. According to Sonia Corrêa, co-coordinator of Sexuality and Policy Watch, these bills are not rooted in an ideological belief but are an effort to "lure the constituency of [far-right politician] Javier Milei".

During the COVID-19 pandemic, Milei expressed skepticism about COVID-19 vaccines. He questioned the national government COVID-19 vaccination policy, and opposed mandatory vaccination. In November 2021, Milei vaccinated himself for COVID-19, citing economic reasons based on a risk–benefit analysis that he made, and rejected the anti-vaccination label that was used to describe his views on the issue; he dismissed the negative impact his COVID-19 vaccine statements could have had on the campaign against COVID-19. Before his vaccination, he said that his skepticism was due to an evaluated "income-risk" he made and his claim that not all vaccines were "well tested". He said: "Pharmacological products require ten years of empirical testing and this product is a year and a half old." The World Health Organization stated that "the safety and efficacy required by vaccines are not in question" despite the fact that they were developed "at an unprecedented speed". About his decision to get vaccinated, he said: "Now I am entering Congress, I am going to give up my diet, on 10 December I am leaving my job, I have to go to give talks in Uruguay, the United States, Chile, and Spain, and I cannot enter without the vaccine. What do I do? Do I run out of income? What do I live on?" He chose the Sinopharm BIBP COVID-19 vaccine because it is an inactivated virus vaccine.

A climate change denier, Milei rejects the existence of global warming, contradicting the scientific consensus on climate change, and attributes it to a socialist invention; he said that concerns about climate change are nothing more than "deceptions promoted by the neo-Marxists". Milei promotes the far-right Cultural Marxism conspiracy theory. He uses Cultural Marxism as a label to accuse left-wing politics and progressives of enforcing political correctness. This includes usage of Cultural Marxism in reference to an alleged gender ideology, feminism, climate change, LGBTQ movements, minority rights, and public education and comprehensive sex education (ESI) in schools, which he has linked to brainwashing; he said that students are "hostages of a system of state indoctrination". He intends to eliminate the law that makes ESI in schools mandatory, saying its naive to think it would not be used for what he sees as indoctrination, and he wants to implement an education voucher system to decentralize education by "giving the budget to parents". Additionally, Milei linked Cultural Marxism to the Ministry of Women, Genders, and Diversity, and expressed his intent to close that ministry if he is elected president. Milei's criticism of ESI, which he defined as part of a "post-Marxist agenda" and a ploy leading to the "destruction of the most important social nucleus, the family", prompted a response from Amnesty International, which warned about its possible removal, said that ESI is important to the prevention of child sexual abuse, and dismissed allegations that it is used to promote being transgender or crossdressing.

=== Immigration ===
Argentina is one of the few countries whose constitution establishes the promotion of immigration as one of the duties of the state; together with the United States, Argentina was that had more immigrants between the end of the 19th century and the beginning of the 20th century. On immigration issues, Milei's 2023 presidential platform includes restrictions. Milei stated that he would prohibit the entry into the country of migrants with a criminal record and said that he want to expel those who commit crimes.

=== Argentine politics ===
Milei praised some measures of the first government of Carlos Menem, whom he considers the "best president of all history", and his economy minister Domingo Cavallo. In addition to that, he honored Juan Bautista Alberdi, and the Argentine historic presidencies era of Bartolomé Mitre, Domingo Faustino Sarmiento, and Nicolás Avellaneda. For their government efforts as part of the Conservative Republic, he also praised the Generation of '80, including Justo José de Urquiza, Julio Argentino Roca, and Carlos Pellegrini. Milei criticized the judiciary for allegedly persecuting opponents and favoring friends, and his proposed judicial reform include the appointment of a supreme court judge who is says would be "a feral defender" of the ideas of Alberdi. He questions the governments and policies applied by the Radical Civic Union, the Justicialist Party, and military coups in Argentina. While Milei publicily expressed that he is not a defender of the last Argentine military dictatorship (the National Reorganization Process) and the Dirty War, he has questioned the Dirty War's 30,000 disappeared toll. In September 2022, he again questioned the toll. He asked: "Where are they? Show me the list." He described the military dictatorship of Jorge Videla as the leader of "one of the darkest periods of Argentine history" but that "it was also something that was quite complicated". His view is that the guerrilla terrorists of the 1970s should be condemned like the Argentine military dictatorship, seeing that period as a war between the state and terrorism.

Milei argues that "the only time that pure liberalism was applied was in 1860 and we were a prosperous country." He criticized the governments of Hipólito Yrigoyen, Juan Domingo Perón, Raúl Alfonsín, Cristina Fernández de Kirchner, and Alberto Fernández. Milei described 1930s Argentina as a fascist regime that led to Peronism and Perón's "three-legged fascism" rather than a return to liberal policies. Despite his anti-Peronism and criticism of Peronism, some commentators cited similarities and contradictions between Milei and Peronism, and argued that he remains a representative of Peronism, where Peronism is not only an ideology but is considered a way to govern, citing examples of left-leaning Peronism (Kirchnerism) and right-wing Peronism, such as that of Menem, who privatized and engaged in neoliberal reforms. Others agreed that Milei is a populist but argued that he is using populism for liberal ends. Milei also criticized individual politicians of the Juntos por el Cambio centre-right coalition, which he was able to push to the right since 2015. Milei excluded the Juntos por el Cambio leader and former prime minister Mauricio Macri from the political caste he denounce for what he regards as their collectivist policies but criticized Juntos por el Cambio member María Eugenia Vidal, who had said that "we share the same values", as governor of the Buenos Aires Province for not keeping her campaign promises of lower taxes. Milei described Patricia Bullrich, the 2023 Juntos por el Cambio leader, as "part of the Argentine failure".

=== Foreign policy ===
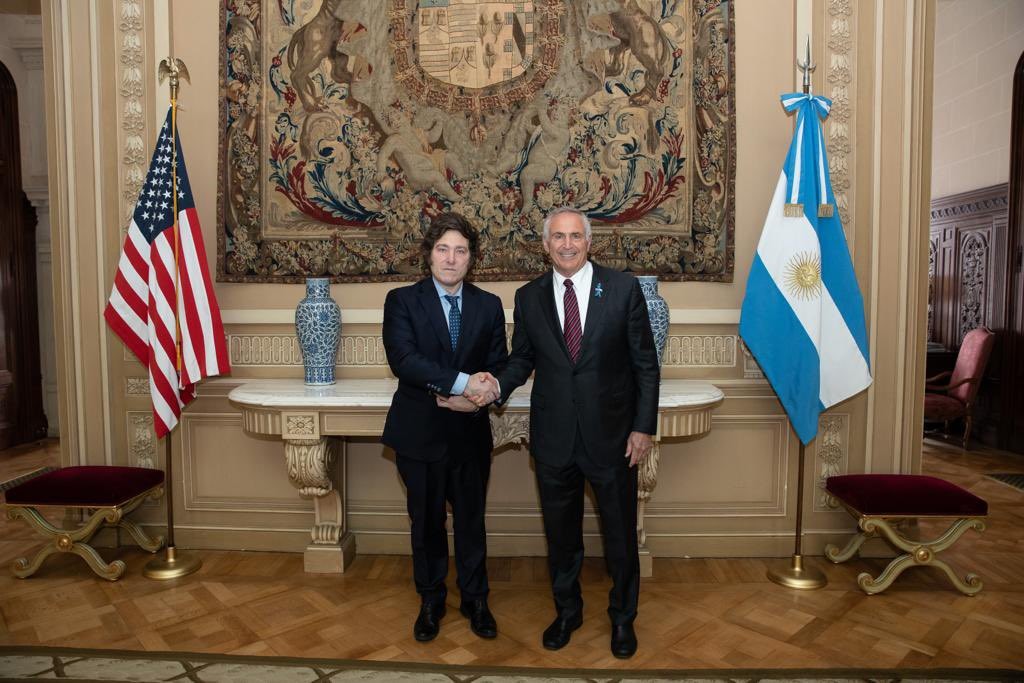
Milei with Marc Stanley, the U.S. ambassador to Argentina, in 2022

Milei's foreign policy proposals have been described as radical. In August 2023, he dismissed the possible participation of Argentina to BRICS, said he would freeze relations with China, and have Argentina, South America's second-biggest economy, pull out of the Mercosur trade bloc with Brazil. Additionally, he scorned socialists in Latin America and abroad. Analysts stated that a breakdown of Argentina–China relations could harm the Argentine economy. About China, Milei said: "People are not free in China, they can't do what they want and when they do it, they get killed. Would you trade with an assassin?"

Milei endorses the Madrid Charter, a document drafted by Vox that characterizes left-wing groups, such as the São Paulo Forum and the Puebla Group, as enemies of Ibero-America and accuses them of engaging in "a criminal project under the umbrella of the Cuban regime" that "seeks to destabilize liberal democracies and the state of law". He signed the document alongside other far-right politicians across the region, including Eduardo Bolsonaro from Brazil, Rafael López Aliaga from Peru, and José Antonio Kast from Chile. On foreign policy, he stated that the United States and Israel would be his primary allies if elected president. He also expressed his intention to relocate the Argentine embassy in Israel from Tel Aviv to Jerusalem. He condemned the October 7 attacks.

At the start of the Russian invasion of Ukraine in early 2022, Milei entered the Palace of the Argentine National Congress with a Ukrainian flag, showing his position towards the conflict. A supporter of law-and-order politics, Milei endorses the unrestricted ownership of firearms, saying that Argentina needs the forces "to have authority again". He is supportive of the heavy-handed policy undertaken by Nayib Bukele in El Salvador. While taking a prudent approach, without ruling the model outright, he stated: "In principle, we say that we have to study it and what Nahuel [Sotelo, deputy] did was go to study it [in El Salvador]. We are studying it because it was extremely successful." In August 2023, Milei said that he would consider appointing former president Mauricio Macri as Argentina's overseas ambassador if he wins the October 2023 general election.

As a proponent of non-interventionism in foreign politics, Milei criticized the Falklands War. About this, he said that a government led by him would advocate for dialogue; at the same time, he admitted that this task "is complicated". He added: "If you want [the islands] to become part of Argentina one day again, it will involve a very, very long negotiation and where Argentina will have to be able to propose something interesting ... You will have to sit down and talk to the United Kingdom and discuss this situation with those who live on the islands." Milei praised Margaret Thatcher, the prime minister of the United Kingdom at the time of the Falklands War, as one of "the great leaders in the history of humanity" and described her as his idol in a November 2023 debate with Massa. Thatcher is widely unpopular in the country due to the Falklands War, with Falklands veterans being particularly upset by Milei's comments.

== See also ==
- Political positions of Javier Milei
- Public image of Javier Milei
