= Mileism =

Mileism may refer to:

- The Maitreya teachings, a group of Chinese beliefs related to Bodhisattva Maitreya
- The political philosophy of Javier Milei, President of Argentina since 2023
