= Mercosur Waterways diplomatic crisis =

2023 trade dispute in South America

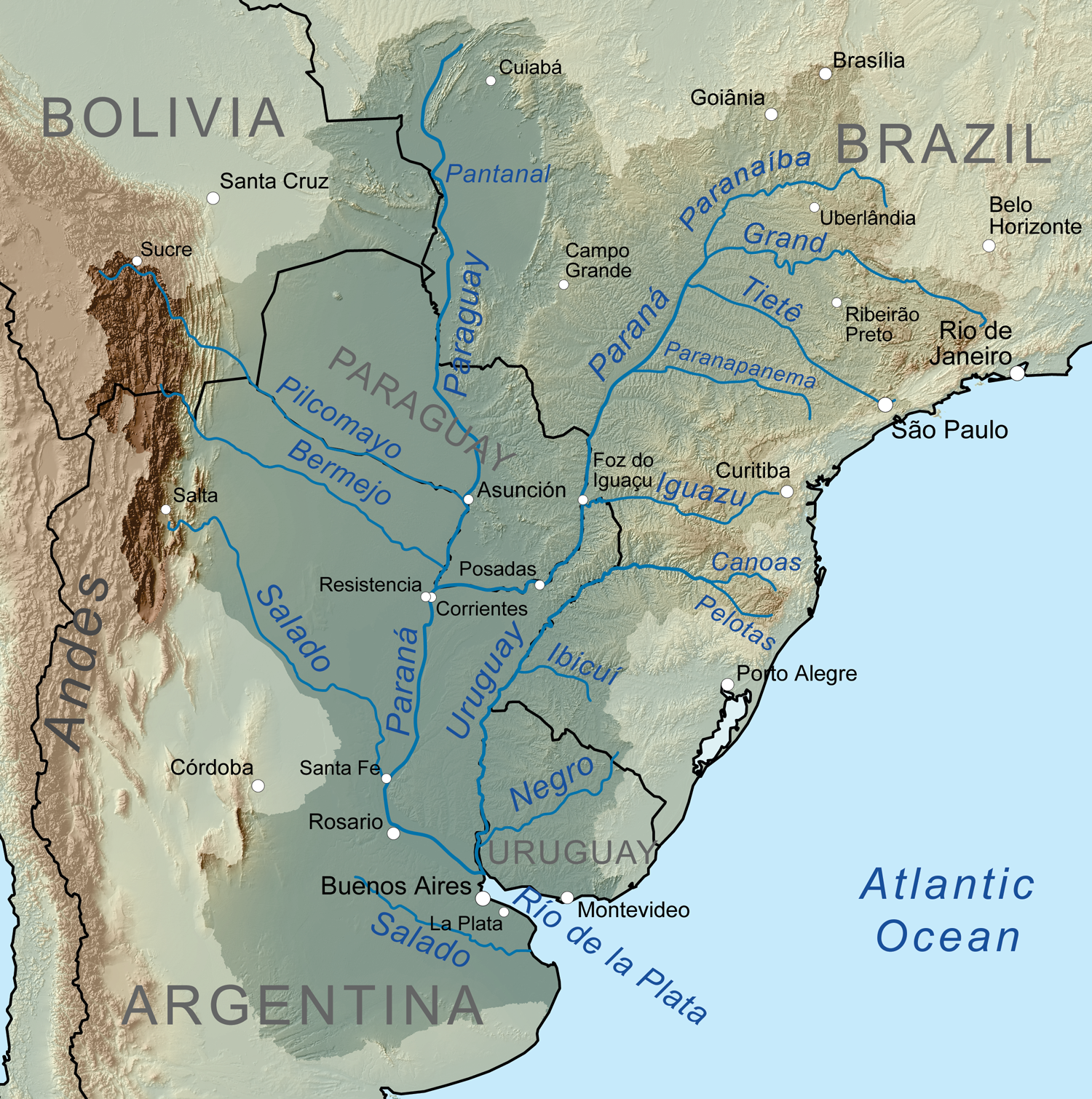
- Map of the Río de la Plata Basin in South America, with major cities and rivers marked
- Date: July 29, 2023 to September 6, 2024
- Location: Mercosur area (Paraná River, Tietê River, Uruguay River)
- Caused by: Establishment of tolls for international ships in the waterway off the coast of Argentina; Non-compliance with the Santa Cruz de la Sierra Agreement by Argentina

Parties
Paraguay; Brazil; Uruguay; Bolivia	Argentina

Lead figures
Santiago Peña; Luiz Inácio Lula da Silva; Luis Lacalle Pou; Luis Arce	Alberto Fernández (until 10 December 2023); Javier Milei

The Mercosur Waterways diplomatic crisis was a regional diplomatic conflict over the free navigability of the rivers in the Río de la Plata Basin, between the government of Argentina and the rest of the countries of the main waterway of Mercosur, among which are Paraguay, Bolivia, Uruguay and Brazil. Mercosur asked that the toll of the Argentine sector of the waterway be lifted unilaterally due to the potential damage to the development, trade and economic integration of the region.

The Permanent Transportation Commission of the La Plata Basin (CPTCP), made up of the users of the navigable waterway from the five signatory countries of the agreement, certified that "the hydro-morphological conditions of the river in the Santa Fe-Confluencia section, due to its natural depths, allow the safe navigation of vessels at a 10-foot draft for 24 hours, without the need for dredging interventions." Likewise, it was stressed that "with the technology available, it is not necessary to provide the beacon service for that sector either."

With the surprise election victory of Javier Milei in the 2023 Argentine general election, the impact of the conflict on the proposed Mercosur-European Union trade deal became uncertain. The crisis ended in September 2024 when the governments of Argentina and Paraguay made an agreement.

== Background ==
On 21 September 2022, the Ministry of Transport of Argentina issued Resolution No. 625/2022 which was formally published in the official gazette on the 30th of that month. In it, it established the collection of the toll on the Paraná River for ships that circulate through the section that goes from the port of Santa Fe to the confluence with the Paraguay River. On December 30 of that year, the aforementioned bulletin announced Resolution 1023/2022 of the Argentine State Secretariat, confirming the rates of the previous provision. The toll began to be collected from 1 January 2023 to ships that circulate between kilometre 1,238 and kilometre 584 of that river course within Argentine territory.

A resolution of the Ministry of Transportation of Argentina established, as of 1 January 2023, a rate of US$1.47 (about 1.33 euros) per ton for international transport vessels and 1.47 Argentine pesos (US$0.0054) per ton for cabotage (domestic) cargoes. Violating several articles of the Santa Cruz de la Sierra Agreement or HPP Agreement on the free international navigation of Paraguay-Paraná, which is protected by the Treaty of Montevideo of 1980.

By the end of January, the first discontent and protests would occur on the part of Paraguay and other regional companies. Uruguay and Bolivia also joined the Paraguayan cause. In a short time, an international committee was formed that ended up being joined by Brazil to request the suspension of toll collection on the waterway.

According to CAFyM data, Paraguay has the largest river fleet in South America and the third in the world, after the US and China, with an investment of 3.7 billion dollars. EFE 70% of the exports of Paraguay, which is a landlocked country, occur by means of river transport, while the imported volume reaches 50%. Several international companies also operate with this river fleet. Bolivia in April 2023, exceeded the burden of US$1,000 million for the use of the waterway.

== Diplomatic crisis breaks out ==
On 29 July 2023, the first seizure of a ship called (HB Grus) with the Paraguayan flag was reported, in the name of the Brazilian-owned shipping company Hidrovías do Brasil carrying a shipment of soybeans for that country. The ship was detained and forced to pay the toll for 10 days, causing losses of US$400,000.

At the same time that the incident occurred, the ship HB Phoenix, flying the Bolivian flag and belonging to the same Brazilian company, reported that the Argentine authorities tried to seize it on the way, until they succeeded in the vicinity of the San Lorenzo toll area. The cargo was also made up of Brazilian goods.

On 1 August, the Brazilian Association for the Development of Inland Navigation (Abani) urged the Brazilian government to convene "an extraordinary meeting of the Paraguay-Paraná Waterway Agreement Commission" to present a complaint following the Argentine government's decision this year to begin charging tolls for vessels sailing north of Santa Fe. The majority of vessels affected by this measure are Paraguayan.

Argentine shipping companies supported the initiative, but admitted that the Ministry of Transportation exceeded the tariff, sharply increasing costs for Argentine oil companies that import soybeans from Brazil, Paraguay and Bolivia, while Paraguayan and Brazilian merchants maintain that the provision violates treaties and multilateral agreements, in addition to the fact that no work has been carried out that justifies charging for a service.

On 15 August, Santiago Peña assumed as president of Paraguay, a few days later, on 24 August, Argentine Minister of Economy Sergio Massa made a stopover in Paraguay on his trip to the United States to deal with IMF issues after his visit to Paraguay he met with the president Peña at the Mburuvicha Róga (Paraguayan presidential residence) accompanied by the Minister of Transport, Pedro Giuliano, in which they would discuss issues of a billion-dollar debt of Argentina to Paraguay for energy of the Yacyretá Dam and tolls on the waterway, among other projects. After the meeting ended, Paraguayan media announced the cessation of tolls between 60 and 90 days to provide a solution to the conflict.

On 25 August, the Argentine transportation ministry denied any cessation of tolls on the waterway despite contradictory statements from Sergio Massa at a press conference.

On 9 September, a ship named LaTere, from the Paraguayan company Mercurio Group, was seized with a convoy of more than 10 barges with 50 million liters of fuel from the British oil company Shell. Demonstrating non-compliance with a suspension of this type of actions in the river, unleashing a new wave of protests by private companies in Paraguay due to the delay in fuel.

On 10 September, a joint statement was issued between the governments of Paraguay, Brazil, Bolivia and Uruguay. Regretting the restriction of free navigation in rivers and emphasizing the problems that these actions can bring to landlocked countries such as Bolivia and Paraguay. At the same time, it is reported that barges owned by Mercurio Group are still being detained even after paying the toll. On September 11, the Mercurio Group barges held by Argentina were released.

The Argentine government excuses that the toll collection must be carried out to maintain the cost of dredging the waterway, according to the Argentine energy secretary, Flavia Royon. Contradicting the fact that all Mercosur countries comply with dredging without charging tolls on rivers. However, what the Secretary of Energy said also contradicts what was said by the Argentine delegation on 23 June, "The Argentine delegation admitted that the toll rate does not respond to dredging interventions and justified it." due to signaling services, constant change of traces and an Automatic Identification System (AIS) that allows knowing in real time the positioning of the vessels and night navigation in said section.¨ these statements were not demonstrated by the delegation, being accused by the other delegations and private users of being inefficient. Until 2022, the Argentine State subsidized the dredging and beaconing of the section, which costs around US$20 million.

Analysts from Uruguay have warned that the decision to collect the toll affects the course of logistics that reaches Uruguayan ports from the interior of Brazil, Bolivia and Paraguay, generating significant losses of money, as well as the possibility that Argentina could impose also tolls on the Argentine side of the Uruguay River affecting internal Uruguayan producers.

On 16 September, the Paraguayan-United States Chamber of Commerce (USAPACC) issued a press release, highlighting that the Argentine Government is violating several treaties, agreements, bilateral and multilateral conventions, including the UN convention on human rights at sea (UNCLOS), as well as the free navigation treaties of 1852, 1856, 1876, 1967 and 1991 that recognized the rights of Paraguay. The measure directly affects Paraguay, Bolivia, Brazil and Uruguay since it is considered a serious replay in the integration of Mercosur. They also highlighted that Paraguay has the third largest river fleet in the world, through which they export and import all types of products, as well as offer their international services to the landlocked regions of the Río de la Plata Basin. They affirm that the material damages are quantifiable and will continue to grow due to the sustained economic and social advance, and there are also psychological, moral and social damages from aggression against the relatively small population of the Guaraní people.

Finally, they affirmed that the damage to trade in Mercosur is direct, just as there is indirect damage with other countries that have trade with Paraguay, among them: the United States. The last paragraphs of the statement talk about how these impositions affect the trade of the United States, as well as taking the necessary measures to defend the interests and help find an immediate solution, regretting the decision of the Argentine Government.

== Consequences ==
Paraguay agreed to the demands of the ANDE and decided to withdraw 100% of the energy produced by the Yacyretá Dam, demonstrating a million-dollar debt of the Argentine government for energy being close to US$150 million. This decision would create an electrical energy deficit with the Argentine government of at least 15%. Argentina accused Paraguay of deliberately opening the Aña Cuá gates of the same dam, releasing more than 2,000 cubic meters of water, an action that would generate lower production from the hydroelectric plant.

Paraguay plans to go to the Permanent Review Court of Mercosur to resolve the crisis with arbitration and lawsuit. The Paraguayan government also decides to withdraw support for Argentina from international organizations such as the International Monetary Fund.

The governments of Uruguay and Paraguay signed agreements that allow Paraguay to invest in the construction of a new port in the department of Soriano in Uruguay and the use of the port of Montevideo, which will allow Paraguayan shipping companies to stop paying the concept for the use of Argentine ports. These agreements will also be added to the agreements with Bolivia for the use of Uruguayan ports made in 2019.

The United States will support the 4 Mercosur claimant countries in the negotiations, to convince Argentina to lift the restrictions.
