= Public image of Javier Milei =

Public image of the incumbent president of Argentina

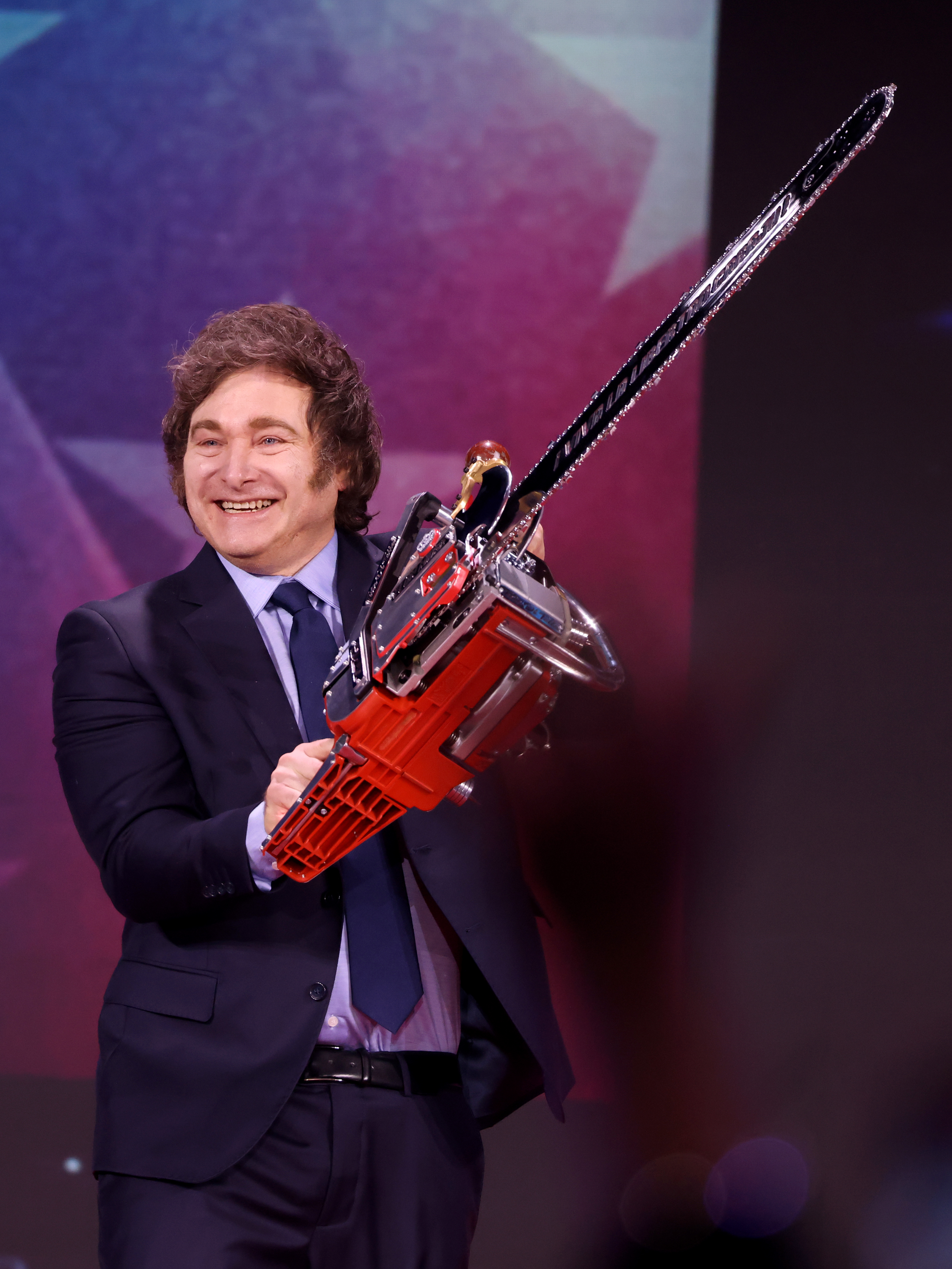
Milei wielding a chainsaw

Javier Milei, the president of Argentina since 2023, has cultivated a complex and controversial public image marked by a blend of right-wing populist, right-wing libertarian, and conservative ideologies. Known for his ultra-liberal economic views and right-wing populist rhetoric, his political stance has been subject to various interpretations by international media and political commentators. Milei's rise to prominence during the 2023 Argentine presidential election, fueled by his primary win, sparked widespread attention. His proposals, including the abolition of the Central Bank of Argentina and the adoption of dollarization, have been both acclaimed and criticized.

Despite criticism and controversies, Milei's advocacy for economic liberalism, fiscal conservatism, and reduced government intervention, alongside his anti-establishment image, has resonated with a segment of the Argentine electorate frustrated with traditional political structures that brought him to the presidency. His public image encapsulates the polarizing nature of his political and economic ideologies within the context of contemporary Argentine politics.

== Life ==
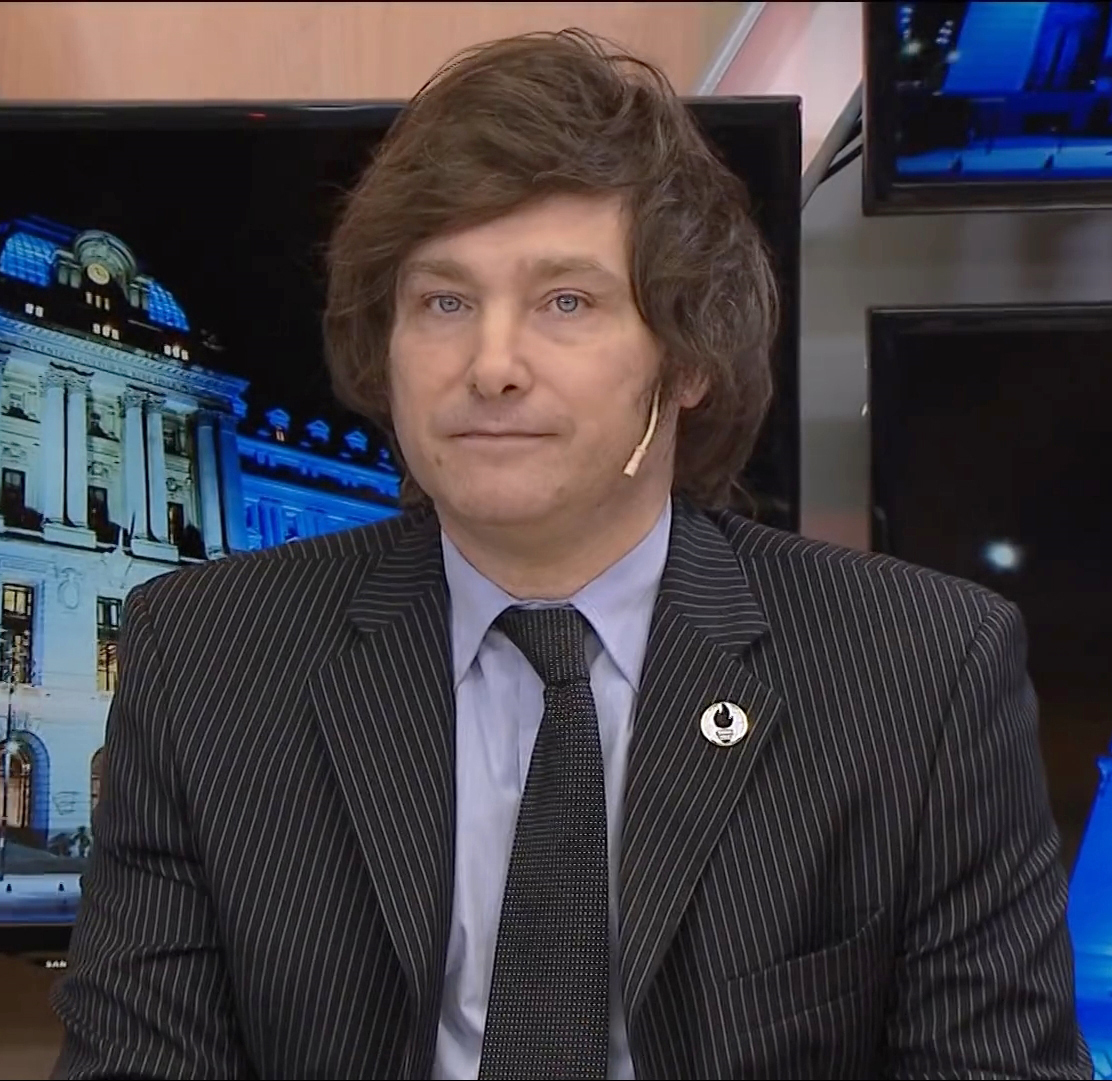
Milei during a 2019 interview on Todo Noticias

Milei's life attracted significant attention and at times controversy, and has been described as eccentric, and he garnered a significant following for his bombastic style, television appearances, and rock musician history; he appealed to the issues of corruption in Argentina, and railed against what he describes as Argentina's political caste. He was a goalkeeper before studying economics at the University of Belgrano, and also formed a cover band in his youth and has taught economics. Notable moments in Milei's political campaign included a viral video of him tearing cards from a wallboard with the names of ministries that he wants to abolish and tossing them into the air as he said afuera ("out of the way"), wielding a chainsaw on stage, and smashing a piñata on air to symbolize his plans.

Due to his eccentric hairstyle, Milei has been nicknamed El Peluca ("The Wig"). He has consistently said that he does not comb his hair, leading to significant press attention, as well as comparisons to fellow right-wing populists Boris Johnson, Donald Trump, and Geert Wilders. Only Lilia Lemoine, vice president of his party and a cosplayer, is able to style his hair. Milei is a cosplayer himself, and has a superhero persona called "General AnCap". He also champions free love. In a June 2020 interview, he disclosed his involvement in several threesomes and his role as a neotantra instructor, describing himself as a tantric sex instructor, claiming to be able to withhold ejaculation for three months. In May 2022, Milei said: "I will not be apologizing for having a penis. I don't have to feel ashamed of being a man, white, blond with light blue eyes." In addition to his El Loco ("The Crazy One") nickname, news outlets called him a "rock singer and tantric sex instructor", a "former tantric sex coach", a "mixture of a messianic preacher and a rock star", and likened him to Trump. Milei calls himself "The King of the Jungle".

In July 2023, Juan Luis González released El Loco, an unauthorized biography of Milei, whom he interviewed several times. The book sought to define the New Right in Argentina, and González said he could not avoid discussing Milei, including his eccentric personal life, ranging from telepathy and esotericism to speaking with his dead dog to his "God-sent mission" to become Argentina's president. In the book's preface, González wrote: "With the passing of the months, the interviews, the off-the-record meetings, following invoices, stamps, and paperwork, the work went from being a field one with almost academic edges to a tragicomic thriller, halfway between Raymond Chandler's black noirs and John Kennedy Toole's A Confederacy of Dunces."

Javier Milei was elected as one of the Time Persons of the Year for 2024.

== Economics ==
Milei has authored several books on politics and economics, and hosted the radio programmes Cátedra librea and Demoliendo mitos. He achieved notoriety and public exposure through his debates and statements on the television programmes of various channels in Argentina, which led him to pursue a political career in 2021. Although part of the Austrian School, which is considered part of heterodox economics and generally holds skeptical views of using mathematics in economics, Milei frequently employs mathematical formulas and charts in his writings. This has led to criticisms from both Austrian School and Argentine mainstream economists. (Note: Austrian criticism of Milei mainly rests on his mathematical formulas and attempts to integrate Austrian School concepts with monetarism; he wrote in 2016 that Ben Bernanke was the greatest president of the Federal Reserve. Instead, Argentine mainstream economists mainly criticized Milei's economic work and his presentention, describing his concepts as confusing, and arguing that the formulas he uses are not correct; in particular, they criticized his Central Bank of Argentina abolition and dollarization proposals. Milei dismissed the critics of dollarization, saying that they do not understand "the condition of transversality". In March 2018, Andrés Aisian rejected Milei's dollarization proposal and his characterization of fiat currency as "counterfeiting money". Aisian argued that Milei conflated the morality of fiat currency with the morality of its original discovery, and described Milei's proposal of a return to the gold standard and metallism as "economic nonsense". In April 2023, Torcuato di Tella University economist Constantino Hevia wrote that "if you scratch it a bit, you realize that Milei knows much less economics than people ... Milei overwhelms with shouts and technical terms that he doesn't quite understand. So, by trying to make everyone ignorant and using a pseudoscientific discourse, he confuses the public and his figure as a technician or mathematical economist, as he likes to call himself, grows. The truth is that Milei is technically weak. The example of his notes is very clear." He concluded that "Milei's insufficient mathematical preparation and his huge ego lead him to say nonsense that is technically wrong." Milei's dollarized economy proposal for the 2023 Argentine presidential election is based on advices from economists Emilio Ocampo and Nicolás Cachanosky, both of whom had approached Milei to determine the best path to dollarization.)

Milei has been described as a controversial and eccentric economist, and ultralibertarian economist. In 2021, he was accused of plagiarism in his El Cronista and Infobae columns and works from El camino del libertario to Pandenomics, in which he was accused of having plagiarized three Mexican scientists. For his columns, he was accused of having plagiarized the main authors of the Austrian School, such as Henry Hazlitt, Ludwig von Mises, Murray Rothbard, Friedrich Hayek, and Walter Block. He dismissed those allegations, saying: "It doesn't make sense." He argued that, as they were disclosure notes, there was no need to name the authors for a practical issue. For Pandenomics, he was accused of having plagiarized the works of other academics, such as a mathematical model to study different epidemic outbreaks throughout history, among others.

== Political positions ==
Political commentators categorize Milei's ideological views as a blend of populist, right-wing libertarian, and conservative strands, along with ultraliberal economics, right-wing populist, ultraconservative, and far-right politics, and representing anti-politics. Milei's proposed abolition of the Central Bank of Argentina and dollarization have met criticism. Milei's foreign policy views have been described as radical as his social and economic views. Argentine mainstream economists also criticized his economic work and his presentation, describing his concepts as confusing and arguing that the formulas he uses are not correct; in particular, they criticized his Central Bank of Argentina abolition and dollarization proposals. Milei dismissed the critics of dollarization, saying that they do not understand "the condition of transversality".

Despite his anti-Peronism and criticism of Peronism, some commentators cited similarities and contradictions between Milei and Peronism, and argued that he remains a representative of Peronism, where Peronism is not only an ideology but is considered a way to govern, citing examples of left-leaning Peronism (Kirchnerism) and right-wing Peronism, such as that of Carlos Menem, who privatized and engaged in neoliberal reforms. Others agreed that Milei is a populist but argued that he is using populism for liberal ends. Milei also criticized individual politicians of the Juntos por el Cambio centre-right coalition, which he was able to push to the right since 2015.

Milei's stances on social issues, such as abortion, are the main reason why political commentators and other libertarians do not consider him truly a libertarian. Among libertarians, some described him as a libertarian for his overall economic libertarian or neoliberal stances, and rejected comparisons to Donald Trump and Jair Bolsonaro, while others cited the issue of abortion as a reason not to call him a libertarian. Milei said: "I am against abortion because I believe in the life project of others. The woman can choose about her body, but what she has inside her womb is not her body, it is another individual." In response, Carmen Beatriz Fernández, an expert in political communication, stated that Milei is not libertarian but a "neopopulist or right-wing authoritarian". Guillermo Tell Aveledo, a political scientist and dean of the Faculty of Legal and Political Studies of the Metropolitan University of Caracas, said: "His criticisms on issues such as budgets and specific policies, both in his time as a commentator on television programmes and now as a congressman, have been directed at the size and action of the state, so he fits the profile of a libertarian." At the same time, he agreed that Milei's conservative positions and other contradictions prevented him from being considered a "genuine libertarian". As a result, he argued that "paleolibertarian (conservative libertarian)" or "anarcho-capitalist", namely someone who believes in a form of stateless free-market capitalism, or that society can be organized and function only with the market without the need for the state, are more appropriate labels to describe Milei's politics.

=== Academic analysis ===
Political scientists generally place Milei within the context of the global far-right, along with Donald Trump and Jair Bolsonaro. Milei has been referred to as the "Trump of the Pampas", although there is some disagreement about his comparisons with Trump. Federico Finchelstein, an Argentinian historian who studies the global far-right, said that Milei was even more dangerous than Trump. On the eve of Milei's election, Finchelstein stated: "He is way more excessive and unstable than [Jair] Bolsonaro and Trump. So it's highly unpredictable what this person could do [in power]." Benjamin Gedan, director of the Argentina Project at the Washington-based Wilson Center, said: "Far-right figures are giddy about Milei's victory and will attempt to recruit him to their global movement. He clearly sympathizes with many of these individuals and their political parties. That said, there are signs he will chart a more independent course." Pointing to Milei's clearer outsider persona, his being a more ideologue than Trump, and a right-wing economic libertarian and opponent of protectionism, Gabriel Vommaro, a sociologist and political analyst based in Argentina, stated that it would be a mistake to make the comparison "without taking into account local particularities." Instead, those opposed to Milei–Trump comparisons argued that Pedro Castillo, the former president of Peru, was a more local and apt comparison to make for Milei, both being clearer political outsiders and lacking parliamentary majority. Thus, Gerardo Munck, an Argentine professor of international relations at the University of Southern California, asked: "The problem with Milei is that he is likely to be weak rather than very strong. Is he closer to Trump or to Pedro Castillo?"

While in the words of Cristóbal Rovira, a professor of political science at the Catholic University of Chile, "Milei has a libertarian component that makes him a rare creature compared to the ultra-right of Latin America", he is placed within the context of the global far right. He said: "There is a fairly global wave of the extreme right. They start in Western Europe, where the emblematic case of Jean-Marie Le Pen is in France in the 1980s, they expand to Eastern Europe and today we see that they are beginning to gain territory in other places: Trump, Bolsonaro." According to Rovira, "Milei would fit into the prototype of what these ultra-rights are." He said: "At an academic level we define them by two important criteria. First, they are to the right of the mainstream right and profess much more radical ideas. In the case of Argentina, Milei is positioned to the right of Macrismo. Second, they maintain an ambivalent relationship with the democratic system and sometimes profess authoritarian ideas. That differentiates them from the traditional right, which act within the rules of the democratic game." According to Rovira, "Milei's case fits very well into this double classification."

Andrés Malamud, a researcher at the Institute of Social Sciences of the University of Lisbon, argued that Milei's speech is anarcho-capitalist since "it's limited to interests and incentives: lowering taxes, reducing state intervention, liberalizing even organ trafficking. ... Technically, he's also a minarchist. A doctrinaire ultraliberal would be the most understandable." About Milei's appeal, Malamud said: "The political secret is to appeal to the basic instincts, under simple banners: liberty, life and property. That's why Milei loves television sets, where he yells, insults and crushes anyone who criticizes him. His curly black hair is the icon of his campaign. On stage, he wears black leather – fire is lit at the climax of his speeches." Malamud added that "Milei is a vitalist: he's not here 'to guide lambs but to wake up lions,' as he himself says. This is where he gets his conservative values, such as nationalism and anti-abortionism." Pablo Touzón, a political scientist and director of the consulting firm Escenarios, said that "Milei is a war machine against [the political class], a brick thrown against the window of a jewellery store." Touzón added: "He combines a kind of ultraliberal orthodoxy, from [Milton] Friedman and [Friedrich] von Hayek... he sees himself as a warrior against the state. But he combines that hyperliberal ideology and freedom with elements of the extreme-right." About his comparisons with Trump, Touzón stated that Milei represents a local version of Trumpism that does not defend protectionism. About his rise in the polls, Touzón said: "If he has so many voters, it's not because he's liberal – it's because he represents the anti-establishment, as Podemos did in Spain from the left. Here, [in Argentina], it's done from the right."

== 2023 presidential election ==
=== Election news coverage ===
In 2021, Milei rejected the use of the far-right label to describe his views and said: "I'm a liberal and libertarian, these positions are things of the left, because for the left, everything that is not on their side is on the right." Shortly before the 2022 French presidential election, Milei was compared to candidate Marine Le Pen. Milei's surprise victory in the August 2023 Argentine primary elections achieved international recognition and headlines, which reported on this and the uncertain Argentine electoral scenario for the October 2023 Argentine general election. Analysts saw his win a result of voters being frustrated by both Peronist and non-Peronist governments. Much of the international press mentioned dollarization and highlighted his controversies, such as the sale of organs and the free bearing of arms. They also cited the escalation of the dollar and the rise in interest rates of Argentina's central bank and placed it within the context of a scenario of extreme volatility and uncertainty.

Milei was described as a far-right populist, far-right outsider, far-right libertarian, libertarian populist, ultraright, and ultraliberal, and labelled far-right or radical right by international news agencies like Al Jazeera English, the BBC, and Reuters; newspapers including The Economist, The Daily Telegraph, the Financial Times, Le Monde, The New York Times, and The Wall Street Journal; news magazines like Time; and several Argentine and Spanish-language publications including among the others El Diario, elDiario.es, El Mundo, El País, Perfil, Télam, and Tiempo Argentino. Reuters reported that he was a "radical right-wing candidate" and far-right outsider, Time saw him as a far-right populist, El País described him as an "ultra-right libertarian and 'anarcho-capitalist' who represents angry Argentina", CNN saw him as a far-right outsider, The Economist headlined that "Argentina could get its first libertarian president", CBC News described him as a "libertarian firebrand", and the BBC described him as a "Trump admirer". He was compared to Donald Trump, Jair Bolsonaro, Tucker Carlson, and Ron DeSantis.

==== Americas ====
In the United States, the Associated Press emphasized Milei's controversial statements and said he could be Argentina's next president, saying: "He believes selling human organs should be legal, climate change is a 'socialist lie,' sex education is a ploy to destroy the family and that the Central Bank should be abolished." They described him as "the latest example of how right-wing populists are making inroads in Latin America, appealing to a citizenry angry with politics as usual and eager for outsiders to shake up the system." The New York Times highlighted the dollarization proposal of Milei, whom they described as a far-right libertarian, writing: "Javier Milei, who wants to abolish the central bank and adopt the U.S. dollar as Argentina's currency, is now the front-runner in the fall general election."

In Brazil, Folha described Milei as a right-wing radical whose proposals included the "sale of organs, liberalization of weapons, dollarization of the economy, and an end to of the Central Bank". O Globo launched a series of op-eds about Milei winning the October general election and said that the incumbent Brazil president Luiz Inácio Lula da Silva must be ready for what they described as "the arrival of Javier Milei", whom they characterized as "ally of Jair Bolsonaro" and "adverse to the Workers' Party" founded by Lula. In Uruguay, El País headlined "Milei's batacazo in the PASO elections in Argentina: he surpasses Macri's sector and Kirchnerism." In Chile, La Tercera wrote: "Milei hits hard and is the most voted, Bullrich surpasses Larreta, and Kirchnerism is third." In Peru, La República described Milei's victory as a surprise and said that the markets in Argentina collapsed after the primary election results.

==== Europe ====
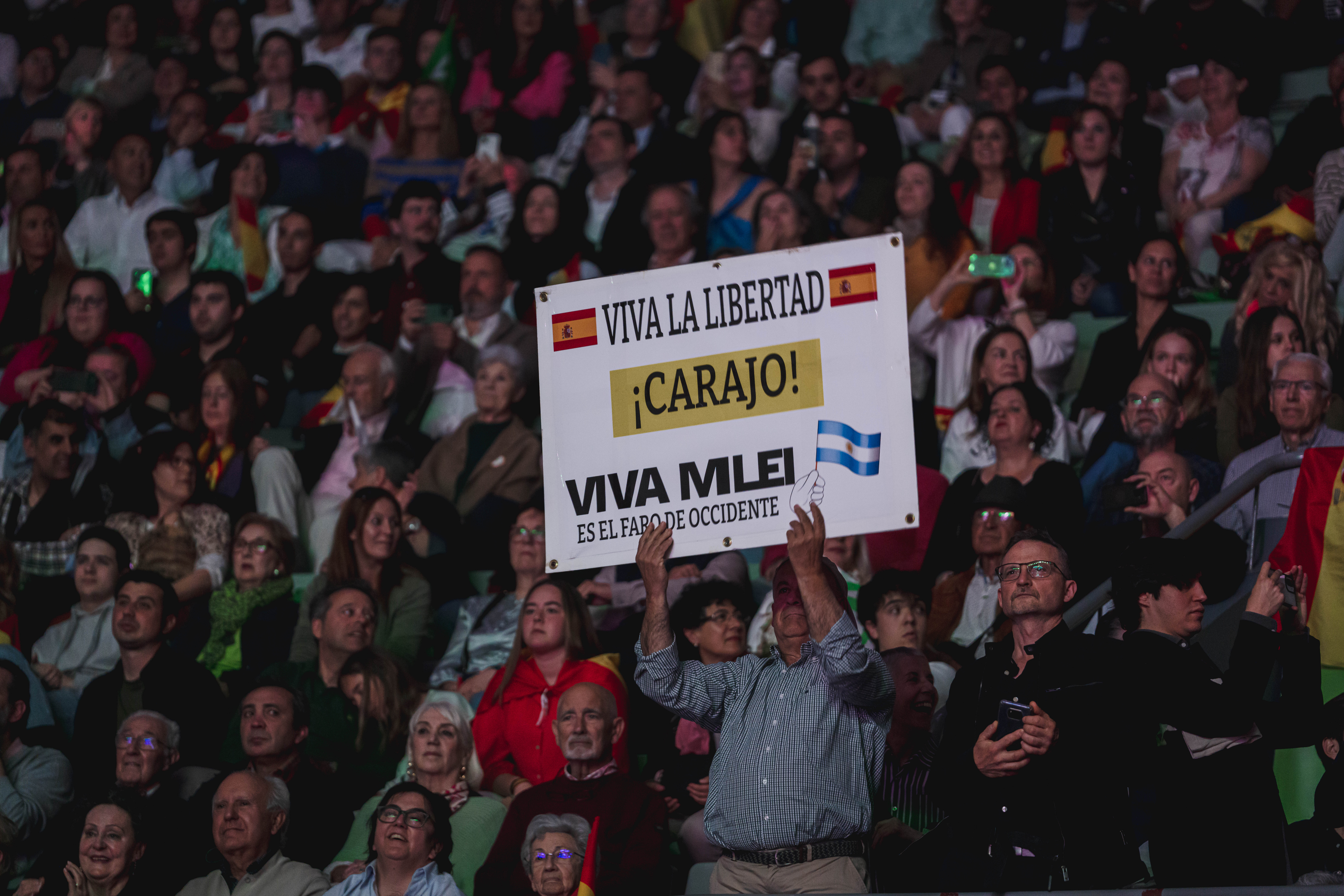
Pro-Milei sign at Vox' Viva 2024 convention in Madrid, May 2024 ("Long live liberty, dammit! Long live Milei! He's the beacon of the West")

In Spain, El Mundo emphasized Milei's win over Peronism, headlining "Argentina. Peronism suffers the worst defeat in its history and Milei's libertarian ultra-right wins the primaries." El País headlined "The ultra Javier Milei capitalizes on the protest vote and wins the primary elections in Argentina." In France, Le Figaro saw the Milei phenomenon as "the new sensation of Argentine politics" and described him as a far-right anti-establishment liberal with "rockstar airs". Le Monde highlighted that Milei "disrupts the Argentine political landscape" in favor of "a state reduced to its minimum expression, he defends the freedom to bear arms and sell organs. He is resolutely climate skeptic and rejects legal abortion, [which was] approved in 2020 in Argentina. It shows its affinities with former presidents Donald Trump and Jair Bolsonaro."

In the United Kingdom, BBC News headlined "The anti-establishment Javier Milei surprises by winning the primaries in Argentina." The Daily Mail headlined "Who is Javier Milei, Argentina's far-right populist politician?" The Financial Times highlighted the political significance of Milei's upset victory, describing him as a radical right-winger who they say shocked the political scene in Argentina and revolutionized the presidential race with his primaries win. Reuters headlined "Argentine far-right outsider Javier Milei posts shock win in primary election" and described Milei's win as a punishment vote by Argentines for the two main political forces in the country. In this way, voters pushed "a rock-singing libertarian outsider candidate into first place in a huge shake-up in the race towards presidential elections in October", and gave "a stinging rebuke to the center-left Peronist coalition and the main Together for Change conservative opposition bloc with inflation at 116% and a cost-of-living crisis leaving four in 10 people in poverty".

In Russia, the state network RT called Milei "controversial and denier", and highlighted the changes that Milei's win would cause to Argentine politics as becoming marked by "tripartism and new leadership", while the state agency Sputnik called him an "outsider candidate" and a "black swan".

==== Eastern Asia ====
In China, the state agency Xinhua appealed to a definition by analyst Rosendo Fraga to describe Milei as "a representative of the Western extreme right who adopts rockstar attitudes" and "found an echo especially among young libertarians".

=== Opinion polling ===
For the 2023 general election, various public opinion polls showed mixed perceptions of Milei in Argentina. For instance, a poll conducted by Atlas Intel in November indicated Milei leading over Sergio Massa with 48.6% against 44.6%. Conversely, Centro Estratégico Latinoamericano de Geopolítica's survey showed Massa slightly ahead with 46.7% to Milei's 45.3%. University of San Andrés and CB Consultora polls also favored Milei, with him leading in different margins. In contrast, Circuitos and Giacobbe polls predicted a tight race, with outcomes swinging between both candidates. These polls underscored a politically divided landscape in Argentina, reflecting the complexity of predicting electoral results in the country.

Following the inauguration of Milei, his popularity increased in public opinion. After the first governmental and economic reforms taken by the president and his ministers, 53% of the Argentine people had a very good and good image of the new head of state according to a popularity poll made by Aresco on 15 December.

In January 2024 According to data collected by Morning Consult Milei had a 64% approval rating, with a 30% disapproval rating and 6% being unsure or expressing no opinion. This made him the third most approved world leader listed behind only Mexican president Claudia Sheinbaum and Indian Prime Minister Narendra Modi, as well as only 1 of 3 world leaders listed who had an approval rating over 50%

== Religious views ==
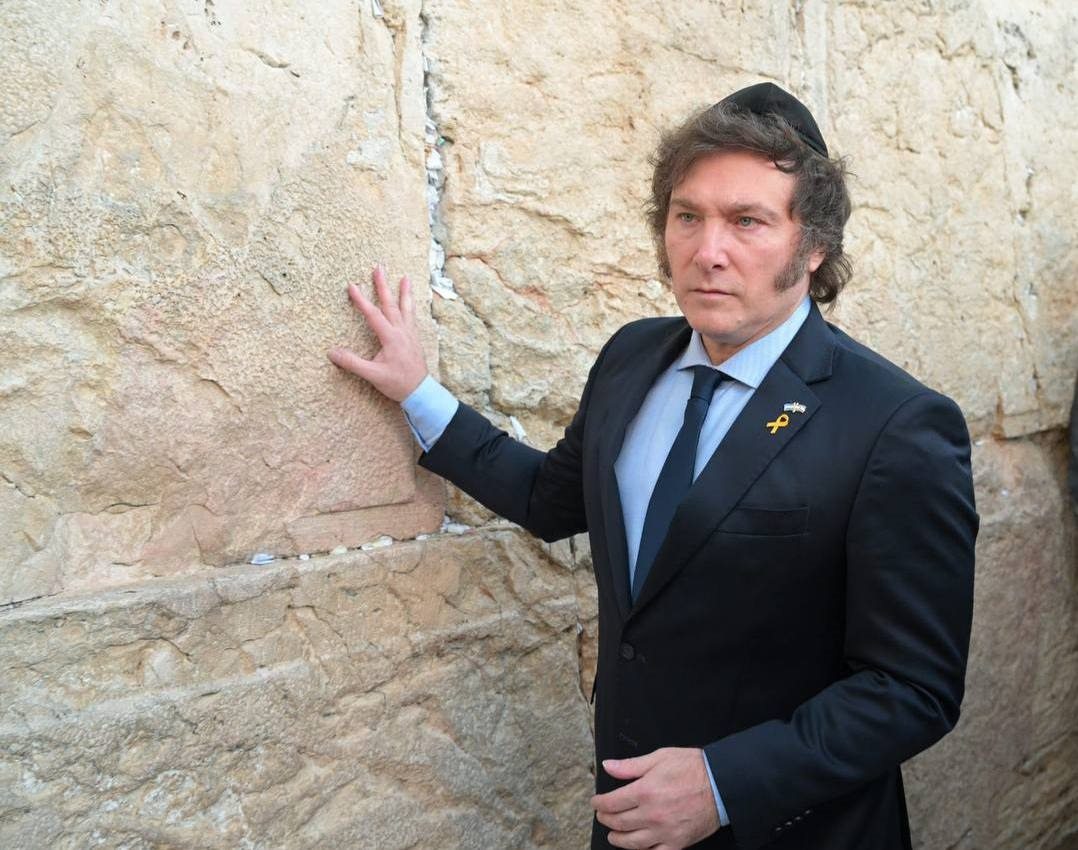
Milei praying at the Western Wall in the Old City of Jerusalem, February 2024

While raised Catholic, Milei has been critical of the Catholic Church under Pope Francis, whom on different occasions he called a "Jesuit who promotes communism", "an unpresentable and disastrous character", "a fucking communist", "communist turd", "a piece of shit", and "a filthy leftist". He also accused him of "preaching communism to the world" and being "the representative of the evil one on Earth" for promoting the option for the poor, a Catholic social justice doctrine of aid to the underprivileged. As a result, the highest authorities of the Argentine Episcopal Conference and other Catholics criticized him. Before November 2023, Milei said he had contemplated converting to Judaism but that observing the Jewish Sabbath could pose challenges if he became president. Milei also reads the Torah daily and has visited the grave of Orthodox rabbi Menachem Mendel Schneerson. In November 2023, it was reported that Milei intended to convert to Judaism.

In a 2018 Radio El Mundo interview, Milei expressed his belief in the existence of God. He reiterated this belief in 2022 to the journalist Luis Novaresio, who retorted: "How can a guy as pragmatic as you believe in something unverifiable?" Milei responded: "That is your case. Very strong things have happened to me, which exceed any scientific explanation." According to Milei, he has had conversations with God, whom he calls "the number 1", and God told him that he had a mission to enter politics and not stop until he became president.

Milei's coalition La Libertad Avanza considers social justice theft because it relies on tax revenues, and Milei has said that Jesus did not pay taxes. In response, about the then upcoming 2023 elections, Francis said: "The extreme right always reconstructs itself, it is the triumph of selfishness over communitarianism. ... I am terrified of saviors of the nation without a political party history." Milei also cited Biblical passages to criticize the state, which he describes as "an invention of the evil one". To show what has been regarded as his rejection of the state, he has repeatedly posed the radical dilemma: "If I had to choose between the state and the mafia, I would choose the mafia. Because the mafia has codes, the mafia adapts, the mafia doesn't lie. And above all, the mafia competes."

== Controversies ==
Milei is well known for his flamboyant personality, distinctive personal style, and strong media presence, which at times caused controversies. Like other right-wing populists, his rhetoric focuses on oppositing what he describes as the political caste. Milei's party was criticized for including among his candidates apologists of the National Reorganization Process. During his political career, Milei has also been involved in several investigations, and has been accused of having a violent attitude towards journalists and critics, as well as of misogynistic behavior.

In May 2022, Milei was accused of having plagiarized scientists like Salvador Galindo Uribarri, Mario Rodríguez Mesa, Jorge Luis Cervantes Cota, and Antonio Guirao Piñera for his Pandenomics (2020) book. Galindo Uribarri was not made aware of this until an interview with Noticias. In August 2022, Ramiro Vasena, a candidate for a small liberal party in Argentina, filed a complaint in a Buenos Aires court against Milei for plagiarism in Pandenomics, describing him as "a compulsive plagiarist". Susana Bianconi, Galindo Uribarri's wife, was not made aware of the case, and Galindo Uribarri, who was said by his wife to have been "offended to the core" for the plagiarism, died of cancer in September 2022.

Milei's political positions have sparked controversy and confusion. Some of his proposals, such as his indifference for same-sex marriage in Argentina and his support for drug legalization, were contrasted to his more conservative policies. Controversial were his opposition to abortion in rape cases, his view of comprehensive sex education in schools as a form of brainwashing, skepticism towards COVID-19 vaccines, civilian firearm ownership support, legalization of organ trade, promotion of the far-right Cultural Marxism conspiracy theory, and climate change denial. Due to those controversies and his radical conservative social and economic policies, his victory in the primaries was deemed an upset, which foresaw his subsequent victory in the 2023 general elections, and led to his description as a far-right libertarian and populist. During the 2023 electoral campaign, his critics often pointed to Milei's controversial pronouncements, which have been described as being part of an outlandish and bizarre behavior, to argue about his incompetency to rule.
