= Tax hell =

Pejorative to refer to countries with very high rates of taxation

A tax hell is pejorative term used in politics to criticize a country's rate of taxation, or its onerous tax bureaucracy. The term has been used by fiscal conservatives and right-wing libertarians to criticize what they regard as oppressive tax policies of countries including Argentina, Belarus, Germany, Mexico, Spain, Haiti, and France. In some cases, the effective tax pressure is difficult to measure for a comparison.

== See also ==
- Anarcho-capitalism
- Taxation as theft
- Tax haven
