= Ultraliberalism =

Term for extreme liberal politics

Ultraliberalism is a political term for extreme liberal politics, which can be used in different contexts.

== Market liberalism ==
Ultraliberalism often refers to an extreme form of market liberalism; in particular, market fundamentalism is also closely associated with ultra-liberal right-wing politics, which radically seek flexible labor markets and the marketization of public services.

Javier Milei, the Argentinian President and right-libertarian politician, is variously described as an ultraconservative or an ultraliberal.

== Left-liberalism ==
Ultraliberalism, in some countries, including the United States, could mean radical, woke, or left-leaning social liberalism and progressivism; in this context, ultra-liberal often has a contrasting meaning to ultra-conservative.

Some American leftists or socialists, such as Squad politicians, are referred to as ultra-liberal in the American political context.

== See also ==
- Anarcho-capitalism
- Classical radicalism
