= Ocean Infinity =

American marine robotics company based in Austin, Texas

- Type: Private
- Industry: Marine robotics
- Founded: July 2017; 9 years ago
- Headquarters: Austin, Texas, United States
- Key people: Oliver Plunkett (CEO)
- Website: oceaninfinity.com

Ocean Infinity is a marine robotics company based in Austin, Texas, United States, and Southampton, United Kingdom, that was founded in 2017. The company uses robots to obtain information from the ocean and seabed.

== History ==
Ocean Infinity is based in Austin, Texas, and Southampton, England, and was founded in July 2017. The company is led by CEO Oliver Plunkett and is privately held. Ocean Infinity was created after recognising the effectiveness of using marine robots in scale to acquire and analyse data from the oceans.

== Robots ==
Ocean Infinity operates two robotic fleets; the Armada fleet and the Infinity fleet. The Infinity fleet is made up of 14 autonomous underwater vehicles that operate globally in the oceans, along with the Armada fleet of robotic ships. The fleets are equipped with sensors and navigation technology capable of operating down to 6,000 meters (20,000 ft) depth. The company reported in May 2022 that the first of 23 Armada surface vessels had recently been launched in Vietnam.

== Projects ==
=== Summary ===
Summary of successful Ocean Infinity search missions:

Ship/Submarine	Date sunk	Date discovered	Depth	Ref
ARA San Juan (S-42)	November 15, 2017	November 17, 2018	920 m (3,020 ft)	
Stellar Daisy	March 31, 2017	February 17, 2019	3,461 m (11,355 ft)	
Minerve	January 27, 1968	July 21, 2019	2,350 m (7,710 ft)	
USS Nevada (BB-36)	July 31, 1948	May 11, 2020	4,700 m (15,400 ft)	
Endurance	November 21, 1915	March 5, 2022	3,000 m (9,800 ft)	
USS Stewart (DD-224)	May 24, 1946	August 1, 2024	1,060 m (3,480 ft)	

=== Details ===
Ocean Infinity was involved in the search for Malaysia Airlines Flight 370 in early 2018, deploying Seabed Constructor between January and May without success. In November of the same year, Seabed Constructor located the wreck of Argentine submarine ARA San Juan, which had disappeared a year earlier. At the end of December 2018, Ocean Infinity was contracted by the South Korean government to search for the wreck of the sunken bulk carrier ship Stellar Daisy, which sank in March 2017 in the South Atlantic Ocean off the coast of Uruguay. On 17 February 2019, the company announced that it believed it had found the ship's wreck, and soon afterward retrieved the voyage data recorder.

In addition to the high-profile wreck searches, Ocean Infinity has also undertaken data acquisition support for Total E&P, Shell Mauritania, Norwegian Petroleum Directorate, Exxon Mobil, NOAA and Petrobras.

In early 2019, the wreck of Grande America was localized by Island Pride, which arrived 30 March and started inspecting the wreck using remotely operated underwater vehicles. In July 2019, the company found the French Navy submarine Minerve, 50 years after its disappearance. In 2020, Ocean Infinity also worked with Search INC to locate the battleship USS Nevada.

Ocean Infinity provided technical expertise and equipment to locate Ernest Shackleton's ship Endurance, which sank 27 October 1915 after having been frozen in the ice of the Weddell Sea off Antarctica. The Falklands Maritime Heritage Trust's project Endurance22 succeeded on 5 March 2022.

In December 2024, it was reported that Ocean Infinity would resume the search for the missing Malaysia Airlines Flight MH370 under a $70 million 'no find, no fee' agreement with the Malaysian government. On December 3, 2025, the Ministry of Transport Malaysia announced that Ocean Infinity would resume the search for MH370 on December 30, 2025. The search would last for a total of 55 days. On 8 March 2026, Ocean Infinity announced that their search concluded as of 23 January 2026 without any findings, after searching an area of over 140,000 km^{2} (54,000 sq mi).
