= Stellar Daisy =

South Korean-owned ore carrier, the largest ship to be lost at sea

History
- Name: Sunrise III (1993–2006); Sunrise (2006–2008); Stellar Daisy (2008–2017)
- Owner: VP-14 Shipping Inc, Majuro
- Operator: Polaris Shipping Co Ltd, Seoul
- Port of registry: 1993–2006: Panama City, Panama; 2006–2008: Monrovia, Liberia; 2008–2009: Busan, South Korea; 2009–2017: Majuro, Marshall Islands
- Route: Brazil—China
- Ordered: 1990
- Builder: Mitsubishi Heavy Industries Nagasaki Shipyard & Machinery Works, Nagasaki, Japan
- Yard number: 2072
- Laid down: July 23, 1992
- Launched: February 25, 1993
- Completed: July 2, 1993
- Identification: Call sign: V7RD9; IMO number: 9038725; MMSI number: 538003486
- Fate: Sank off the coast of Uruguay on March 31, 2017

General characteristics
- Type: Ore carrier
- Tonnage: 148,431 GT; 44,530 NT; 266,141 DWT
- Length: 321.95 m (1,056 ft 3 in)
- Beam: 58 m (190 ft 3 in)
- Draught: 20.326 m (66 ft 8 in)
- Depth: 29.5 m (96 ft 9 in)
- Installed power: 9-cylinder diesel engine, 21,928 kW
- Propulsion: Single shaft; fixed pitch propeller
- Speed: 15.5 knots (28.7 km/h; 17.8 mph)
- Crew: 24

MV Stellar Daisy was a South Korean-owned very large ore carrier (VLOC) that sank on March 31, 2017 in the South Atlantic off the coast of Uruguay while on a voyage from Brazil to China. She was the largest ship, by a factor of nearly 2 on gross tonnage, to be lost at sea.

== General characteristics ==
Stellar Daisy was a single-deck capesize very large ore carrier (VLOC) with an overall length of 321.95 metres (1,056 ft 3 in) and a beam of 58 metres (190 ft 3 in). Fully laden, the vessel drew 20.326 metres (66 ft 8 in) of water and had a deadweight tonnage of 266,141 tons. Her ten cargo holds had a combined bale capacity of 141,332 cubic metres (4,991,100 cu ft). The gross tonnage of the vessel was 148,431 and net tonnage 44,530. On her last voyage, she had a crew of 24.

Like most bulk carriers, Stellar Daisy was propelled by a single low-speed two-stroke diesel engine driving a large fixed pitch propeller. Her 9-cylinder Mitsubishi 9UEC75LSII main engine had an output of 21,982 kW (29,478 hp) at 76 rpm. This gave the vessel a service speed of 15.5 knots (28.7 km/h; 17.8 mph).

The MV Stellar Daisy was classed with the Korean Register of Shipping South-Korean classification society, which surveyed and approved the ship's modifications.

== Career ==
Stellar Daisy was originally built as a very large crude carrier (VLCC) at Mitsubishi Heavy Industries Nagasaki Shipyard & Machinery Works in Nagasaki, Japan. Named Sunrise III, she was laid down on July 23, 1992, launched on February 25, 1993 and delivered to the owners on July 2, 1993.

In 1992, the International Convention for the Prevention of Pollution from Ships (MARPOL) was amended so that all oil tankers of 5,000 DWT or above ordered after July 6, 1993 were required to have a double hull in way of cargo tanks to reduce the possibility of oil spill in the event of hull damage. Following several high-profile shipwrecks leading to significant environmental damage, the International Maritime Organization (IMO) decided to phase out single-hull oil tankers such as Sunrise III with an accelerated schedule.

In 2006, Polaris Shipping Co Ltd, Seoul, purchased four single-hulled oil tankers, including Sunrise III, for conversion to very large ore carriers (VLOC) at Cosco (Zhoushan) Shipyard in China. At the time, this was a typical strategy to increase the lifetime of an otherwise obsolete vessel by another 10 to 14 years and, thanks to the high charter rates of large bulk carriers used to transport iron ore to China, the conversion would pay itself back in just one to two years. Typically, the center tanks of the oil tanker would be split into dry cargo holds while the side tanks would be used for ballast or remain empty. Holes cut on the main deck for cargo hatches and coamings would require additional structural strengthening to retain sufficient longitudinal strength after conversion. A tank top strengthened for high loading rate and grab unloading would be fitted above the bottom frames and girders. The vessel returned to service in 2008 as Stellar Daisy.

== Loss ==
On March 31, 2017, while she was carrying sinter fines (iron ore) across the South Atlantic Ocean from the Vale Ilha Guaíba terminal (23.014°S 44.034°W), near Rio de Janeiro, Brazil, to China, a loud bang was heard and the ship suddenly began listing. An officer radioed that the ship was taking on water and listing heavily. The ship sank very soon thereafter. Radio contact with the ship, last reported to be 1,300 nautical miles (2,500 km) from shore, was lost.

== Search ==
Two Filipino crew members were rescued from a liferaft on April 1 by the cargo ship Elpida. The crew members reported that they had seen their ship sink. The other 22 crew members, 14 Filipinos and 8 South Koreans, remain missing.

A search for survivors and wreckage was made by Uruguayan, Argentine and Brazilian ships, supported by Brazilian and US aircraft, in a search area of 70 by 100 nautical miles (130 by 190 km; 80 by 120 mi), 2,000 nautical miles (3,700 km) off the coast of Uruguay. On April 21, the Uruguayan Navy ship General Artigas returned to port after a 17-day search during which floating debris from the wreckage was found. The search continued with six merchant ships.

In August 2018, the South Korean government approved funding for searching and retrieving Stellar Daisy's voyage data recorder. Exploration company Ocean Infinity's chartered vessel Seabed Constructor departed Cape Town to search for the ship on 8 February 2019, deploying a fleet of autonomous underwater vehicles to simultaneously search the seabed for Stellar Daisy. On 17 February 2019 the company announced that it believed it had found the ship's wreck, and soon afterwards retrieved the voyage data recorder.

== Possible causes ==
While the shipping journal Lloyd's List reported that cargo liquefaction caused by excessive moisture in the iron ore cargo could be a possible cause of the loss, another shipping journal, ShipInsight, argued that while a number of vessels have been lost for this reason, any liquefaction should not have been calamitous for Stellar Daisy because, being a converted oil tanker, her cargo holds were originally the center tanks designed to carry liquid cargo. ShipInsight speculated that the most likely loss for the vessel was linked to her conversion from a tanker to an ore carrier.

In February 2017, China Port State Control (PSC) authorities identified six deficiencies, two of which were related to watertight and weathertight doors, during an inspection in Tianjin, China.

== Aftermath ==
Following the sinking of Stellar Daisy, the International Association of Dry Cargo Shipowners (INTERCARGO) has called for an investigation of the causes leading to the casualty. The safety of ore carriers converted from oil tankers in the 2000s has also been questioned. More than half of the bulk carriers in Polaris Shipping's fleet are such conversions.

Only a few days after the loss of Stellar Daisy, another VLOC owned by Polaris Shipping reported structural damage in one of her ballast tanks below waterline, resulting in a small leak. The 280,000-ton vessel, Stellar Unicorn, was built in 1993 as a single-hull oil tanker and converted to an ore carrier in China in 2008. Like Stellar Daisy, she was fully laden with Brazilian iron ore bound for China when the hull damage was discovered off South Africa. Stellar Unicorn was also found to have structural and water/weathertight deficiencies in a Port State Control inspection in Qingdao, China, in July 2016 but these were cleared in a follow-up inspection. In June 2017, Stellar Unicorn was sent to cold lay-up together with a number of other Polaris VLOCs and finally sold for scrap in September 2017.

On April 13, a Polaris-owned converted VLOC that was leading the search for the missing Stellar Daisy crew members, Stellar Cosmo, was reportedly forced to head to Cape Town for repairs due to structural damage. However, this claim has been refuted by Polaris Shipping which stated that the vessel headed to Singapore for bunkering before continuing to China. Stellar Cosmo was sold for scrap in September 2017.

In May 2017, two cracks appeared on the main deck of Stellar Queen, another converted VLOC owned by Polaris Shipping, during a ballast water exchange operation while the vessel was underway from China to Brazil with empty holds. Published photographs showed sea water pouring from the ballast water tanks through cracks of about 1.5 metres (5 ft) and 2.5 metres (8 ft) in length.

== Investigation and legal proceedings ==
On January 21, 2019, subsequent to an investigation conducted by the Korean Coast Guard at the request of the South Korean government, a South Korean prosecutor indicted Polaris Shipping Head of Maritime Affairs including a KRS surveyor and two thickness measurement technicians. The heads of Polaris Shipping were charged for not notifying the relevant government body of defects of the hull of the vessel and for their loading method which was allegedly not certified by the class society. The heads denied those charges. Moreover, the charges were for procedural issues and not for substantial ones. It was alleged by the prosecutor that the thickness measurement company forged the documents which were to prove that their engineers had fulfilled the annual education required by the licensing entity. This charge was not about thickness measurement itself but about their renewal of the license. Moreover, the charge was denied by the thickness measuring company.

On January 24, 2019, the court however declined to indict at this stage the CEO of Polaris Shipping, Kim Wan-joong, as well as three other persons who had been signaled in the Korean Coast Guard's investigation, including a KRS surveyor and two thickness measurement technicians of a private company involved in forging annual education license document pertaining to qualification of technician working for thickness measurement company.

The court's judge indicated that he may reach additional conclusions after having had the opportunity to review the findings of the undersea exploration which has been recently contracted by the South Korean Government to the US ocean seabed exploration firm Ocean Infinity.
