= Falklands Maritime Heritage Trust =

Maritime charity in the United Kingdom

- Abbreviation: FMHT
- Formation: 6 October 2014; 12 years ago
- Headquarters: London, England
- Chairman: Donald Lamont
- Website: fmht.co.uk

The Falklands Maritime Heritage Trust (FMHT) is a charitable organization in England and Wales, based in London. Led by a group of trustees, the FMHT's goal is to educate Falkland Islanders about maritime history.

== Origin ==
The FMHT was incorporated on 6 October 2014 to educate the public in the Falkland Islands and neighboring seas about maritime history. It was registered with the Charity Commission for England and Wales on 18 November 2014.

== Trustees ==
The FMHT is run by a group of trustees who act as directors of the charity. The founding trustees when the charity was established were David Ainslie, Mensun Bound, William Featherstone, and Donald Lamont. Additionally, Alan Huckle was appointed as a trustee on 8 January 2015, but resigned on 31 December 2018.

== Activities ==
The FMHT donated £50,000 to film the search for the Blue Jacket since full participation in the search was not possible.

The charity has also assisted in the search for German warships lost in the Battle of the Falkland Islands. The search began in December 2014 and was initially unsuccessful, but was resumed five years later. On 11 April 2019, under a contract with Ocean Infinity and using the vessel Seabed Constructor, a team, led by Mensun Bound, located SMS Scharnhorst. This search was filmed under a contract with TVT Productions and the film was titled "Lost Ships." Its premiere was held on 4 December 2019, and it was later sold to the Smithsonian Channel.

The Trust donated £2,000 to the SS Great Britain Trust to support the anniversary of the ship's return from the Falkland Islands.

The FMHT managed an expedition to the Weddell Sea using new equipment aboard S. A. Agulhas II to locate and film the wreck of Endurance, discovering it on 5 March 2022 in remarkably good condition.
