= HMS Battleaxe (F89) =

1980 Type 22 or Broadsword-class frigate of the Royal Navy

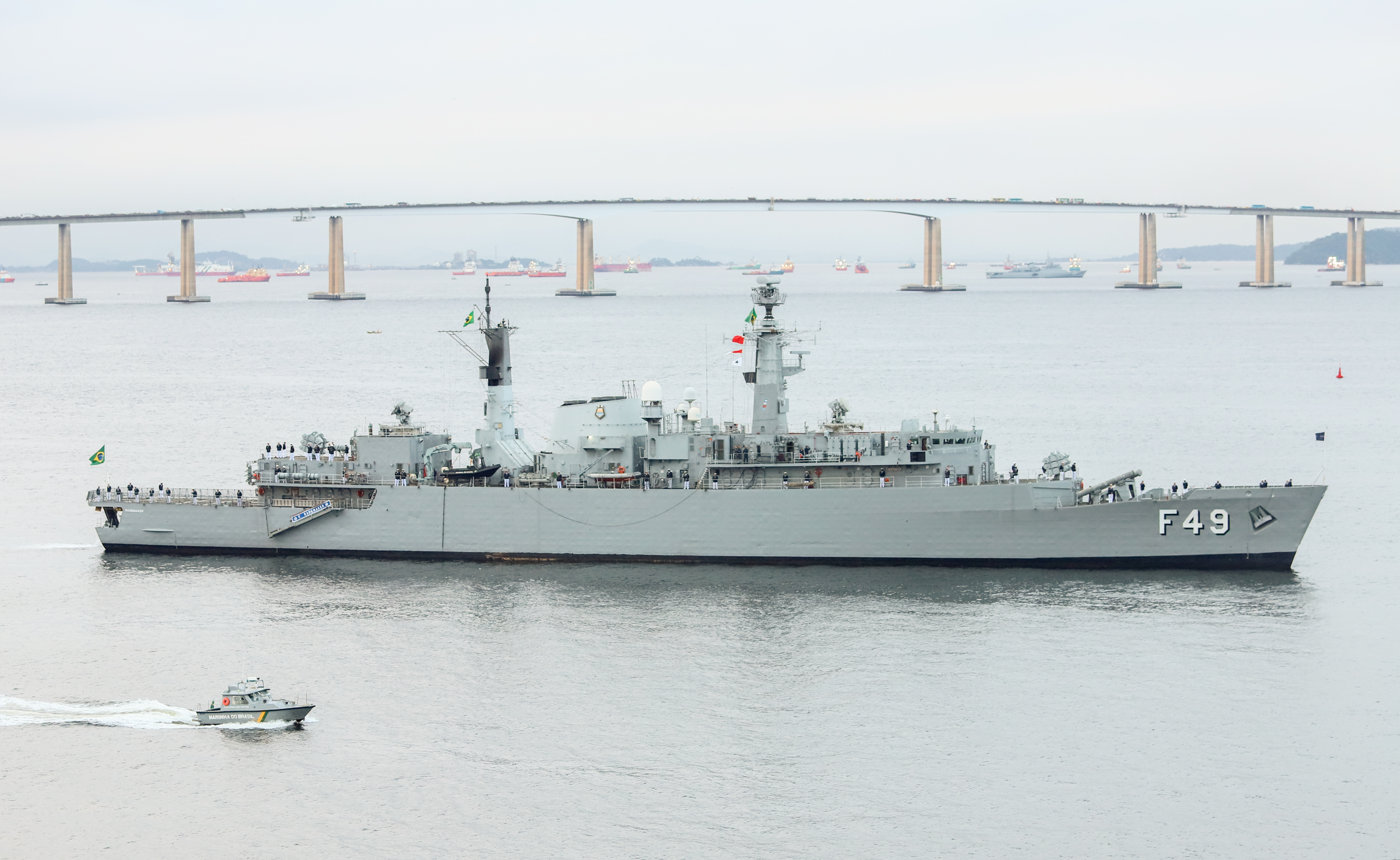
- Brazilian Rademaker in 2022

History

United Kingdom
- Name: Battleaxe
- Namesake: Battleaxe
- Builder: Yarrow Shipbuilders
- Laid down: 4 February 1976
- Launched: 18 May 1977
- Commissioned: 28 March 1980
- Decommissioned: 30 August 1996
- Identification: Pennant number: F89
- Fate: Sold to Brazil 30 April 1997

Brazil
- Name: Rademaker
- Namesake: Augusto Rademaker
- Identification: MMSI number: 710411000; Callsign: PWRM; Pennant number: F49
- Status: In active service

General characteristics
- Class & type: Type 22 frigate
- Displacement: 4,400 tons
- Length: 131.2 m (430 ft 5 in)
- Beam: 14.8 m (48 ft 7 in)
- Draught: 6.1 m (20 ft 0 in)
- Propulsion: 2 shafts, COGOG; 2 × Rolls-Royce Olympus TM3B boost gas turbines, 54,600 shp (40,700 kW); 2 × Rolls-Royce Tyne RM1C cruise gas turbines, 9,700 shp (7,200 kW)
- Speed: 30 knots (56 km/h; 35 mph) max
- Complement: 222
- Armament: 2 × triple torpedo tubes for Mk 46 torpedoes; 2 × 6 GWS25 Seawolf SAM launchers; 4 × 1 Exocet SSM launchers; 2 × twin Oerlikon 30mm/M75
- Aircraft carried: 2 × Lynx MK 8 helicopters

HMS Battleaxe was a Type 22 frigate of the British Royal Navy. She was sold to the Brazilian Navy on 30 April 1997 and renamed Rademaker.

== Construction and design ==
Battleaxe was ordered by the British Admiralty on 4 September 1974, as the second Batch I Type 22 Frigate. The ship was laid down at Yarrow Shipbuilders' Scotstoun shipyard on 4 February 1976, and was launched by Audrey Callaghan, the wife of James Callaghan, the Prime Minister at the time, on 18 May 1977. Battleaxe was completed on 28 March 1980.

Battleaxe was 131.2 metres (430 ft 5 in) long overall and 125.7 metres (412 ft 5 in) at the waterline, with a beam of 14.8 metres (48 ft 7 in) and a draught of 6.1 metres (20 ft 0 in). Displacement was 4,000 long tons (4,100 t) standard and 4,400 long tons (4,500 t) deep load. She was powered by two Rolls-Royce Olympus TM3B gas turbines rated at a total of 54,600 shaft horsepower (40,700 kW) and two Rolls-Royce Tyne R1MC turbines rated at a total of 9,700 shaft horsepower (7,200 kW), driving two shafts in a Combined gas or gas (COGOG) arrangement. They gave a speed of 30 knots (56 km/h; 35 mph) when powered by the Olympuses and 18 knots (33 km/h; 21 mph) when powered by the Tynes. The ship had a range of 4,500 nautical miles (8,300 km; 5,200 mi) at 18 knots (33 km/h; 21 mph).

Anti-aircraft armament consisted of two sextuple Sea Wolf surface-to-air missile launchers, one forward of the bridge, and one on the roof of the helicopter hangar. Four Exocet MM-38 anti-ship missiles were fitted on the forecastle. Gun armament was limited to a pair of 40 mm (1.6 in) Bofors guns, mainly for peacetime patrol duties. A hangar and flight deck was fitted aft, allowing the ship to operate two Westland Lynx helicopters, which could carry anti-submarine torpedoes, while close-in anti-submarine armament was two triple STWS-1 324-millimetre (12.8 in) torpedo tubes.

== Operational history ==
=== Royal Navy ===
Battleaxe was at Gibraltar on 24 March 1982, as part of Exercise "Springtrain 82", but when the Falklands War broke out in April that year, she, unlike sister ships Broadsword and Brilliant, did not deploy to the South Atlantic as she was suffering from problems with her propeller shafts. Battleaxe did deploy to the South Atlantic shortly after the end of the war, however, escorting the aircraft carrier Illustrious, leaving Devonport on 2 August, reaching the vicinity of the Falklands on 24 August and returning to Britain on 19 November. She was deployed to the South Atlantic again from July 1983 to December 1983. On 2 July 1988, Battleaxe rescued the stricken sailors from the yacht Dalriada, which had sunk after colliding with the submarine Conqueror's periscope.

Battleaxe was deployed on the Armilla patrol, the Royal Navy's standing deployment in the Persian Gulf in August 1990 when Iraq invaded Kuwait. She returned to Plymouth in November 1990. Deployed April to October 1995 as part of the Bosnia blockade as part of United nations peace keeping operation.

=== Brazil ===
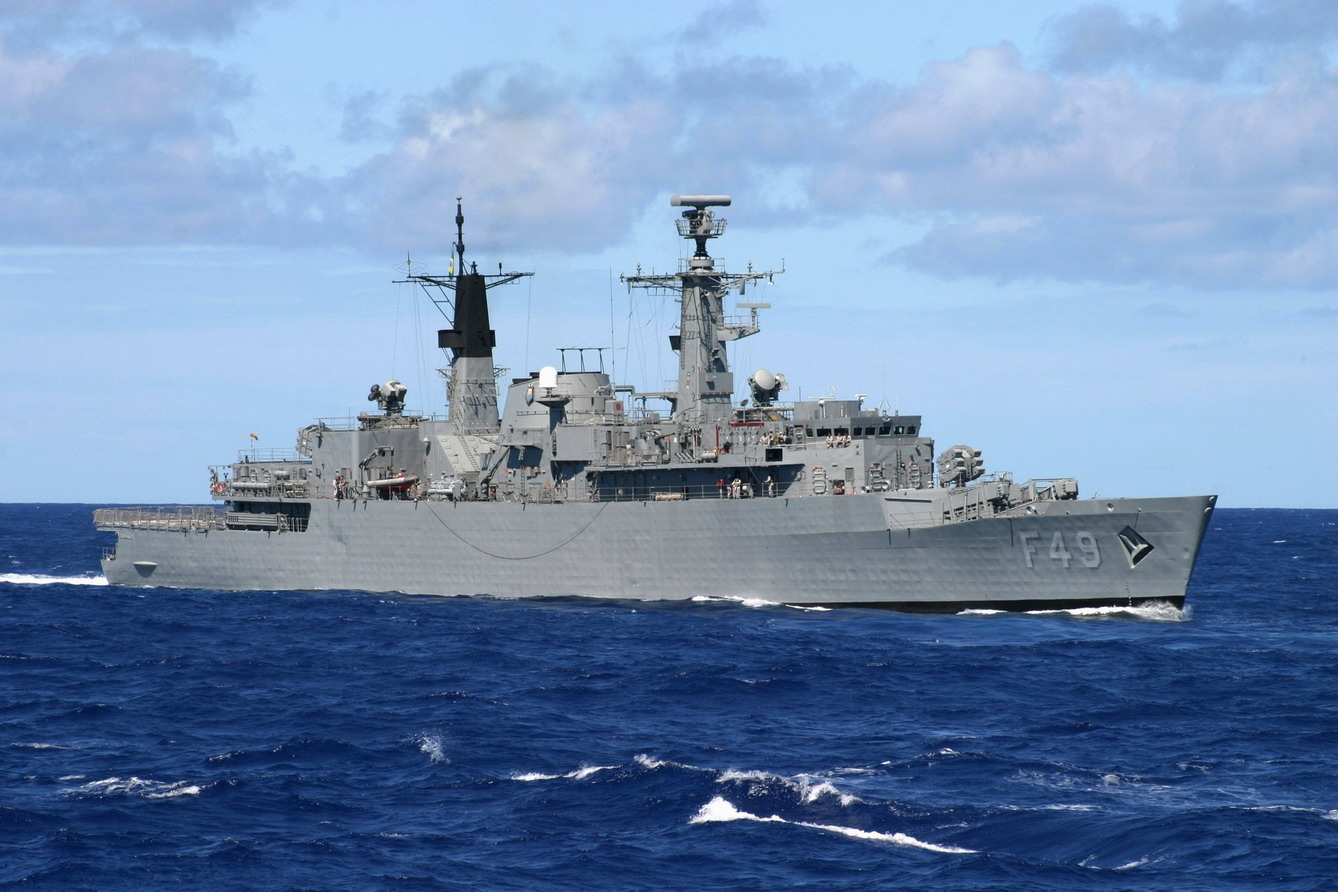
Rademaker in 2006

Rademaker, firing a MANSUP anti-ship missile in September 2024

Rademaker was involved in an unfortunate incident on 29 November 2004, during the annual FRATERNO naval exercise with ships of the Argentinian Navy. While conducting gunnery practice against target drones, a malfunction of the Argentinian frigate ARA Sarandí's automatic weapons system caused her to fire on Rademaker; four Brazilian crewmen were injured together with an Argentine naval observer. The ship suffered moderate damage.

Also in 2004, Rademaker deployed to Port-au-Prince, as part of the United Nations Stabilization Mission in Haiti. In April 2017, Rademaker was involved in the search for the missing bulk carrier Stellar Daisy after she disappeared in the Atlantic. Rademaker joined the international efforts to locate the missing Argentine submarine San Juan in November 2017.

== Cultural references ==
Battleaxe played a significant role in Tom Clancy's 1986 novel Red Storm Rising. Serving along side USS Reuben James (FFG-57), Battleaxe escorts convoys to Europe and to Iceland, sinking multiple submarines in coordination with Reuben James.

== Bibliography ==
- Burden, Rodney A.; Draper, Michael I.; Rough, Douglas A.; Smith, Colin R.; Wilton, David (1986). Falklands: The Air War. British Aviation Research Group. ISBN 0-906339-05-7.
- Colledge, J. J.; Warlow, Ben (2006) [1969]. Ships of the Royal Navy: The Complete Record of All Fighting Ships of the Royal Navy from the 15th Century to the Present (3rd Rev ed.). London: Chatham Publishing. ISBN 978-1-86176-281-8. OCLC 67375475.
- Critchley, Mike (1992). British Warships Since 1945: Part 5: Frigates. Liskeard, UK: Maritime Press. ISBN 0-907771-13-0.
- Friedman, Norman (2008). British Destroyers & Frigates: The Second World War and After. Barnsley, UK: Seaforth Publishing. ISBN 978-1-84832-015-4.
- Gardiner, Robert; Chumbley, Stephen, eds. (1995). Conway's All The World's Fighting Ships 1947–1995. Annapolis, Maryland, USA: Naval Institute Press. ISBN 1-55750-132-7.
- Hastings, Max; Jenkins, Simon (1983). The Battle for the Falklands. London: Book Club Associates.
- Marriott, Leo (1983). Royal Navy Frigates 1945–1983. Shepperton, Surrey, UK: Ian Allan Ltd. ISBN 0-7110-1322-5.
