= The Ship Beneath the Ice =

Book by Mensun Bound

- Author: Mensun Bound
- Language: English
- Genre: Travel literature, archaeology, polar
- Publisher: Pan MacMillan
- Publication date: 2022
- Media type: Print (hardback & paperback)
- Pages: 432
- ISBN: 9781035008414

The Ship Beneath the Ice: The Discovery of Shackleton's Endurance is a 2022 book written by Falklands-born marine archaeologist Mensun Bound.

== Synopsis ==
The book chronicles Bound's quest to find the wreck of the Endurance, Sir Ernest Shackleton's ship, which succumbed to the ice of Antarctica in 1915.

Each chapter of the book features a day-by-day recount, similar to a diary. Weaving together his voyages with Shackleton's, Bound's book also includes stories of Shackleton and his crew. Similarly, alongside photographs from the wreck itself, the book features a selection of Frank Hurley's photos from Shackleton's original voyage in 1914-17.

== Development ==
The project to find the so-called "unreachable" Endurance began in a South Kensington coffee bar in August 2012. Ten years later, in March 2022, she was found 3,000 meters beneath the perennial ice of the Weddell Sea or, what Shackleton called "the worst portion of the worst sea on earth."

She was in an excellent state of preservation, her name still emblazoned upon the ship's stern.

The book recounts both the expeditions to find the Endurance. Mensun Bound was the Director of Exploration on both expeditions. Bound used details from the diaries of Shackleton's men in order to reconstruct the exact whereabouts of the ship under the ice.

The first search, under the auspices of the Flotilla Foundation, entitled the Weddell Sea Expedition, took place in 2019. The objectives of this campaign were mainly scientific. Although ending in failure, with Bound very nearly finding his own vessel frozen in ice, the lessons learned proved invaluable for the success of the second.

The second search, under the auspices of the Falklands Maritime Heritage Trust, took place in 2022 and was called Endurance22. The aims of this campaign were primarily archaeological and historical. People around the world were able to follow the progress of Endurance22 through the daily broadcasts of historian and television presenter Dan Snow. In a remarkable coincidence, the Endurance was finally found a century to the day after Shackleton's burial.

== Reception ==
The Ship Beneath the Ice was a Sunday Times Bestseller, and a Blackwell's Non-Fiction Book of the Month. It was picked as a Waterstones Paperback of the Year in 2023. It has been lauded by Sir Michael Palin, author of Erebus.
