= French submarine Minerve (S647) =

Daphné-class patrol submarine, lost 1968

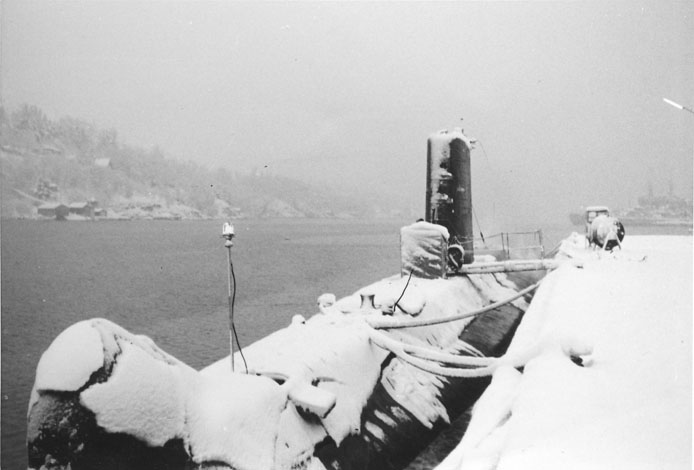
- Minerve in Bergen (Norway) in 1962

History

France
- Name: Minerve
- Namesake: Minerva
- Builder: Chantiers Dubigeon, Nantes
- Laid down: May 1958
- Launched: 31 May 1961
- Commissioned: 10 June 1964
- Home port: Toulon
- Identification: S647
- Fate: Lost with a crew of 52 on 27 January 1968 in the Gulf of Lion; wreckage discovered on 21 July 2019

General characteristics
- Class & type: Daphné-class submarine
- Displacement: 860 tonnes (846 long tons) surfaced; 1,038 tonnes (1,022 long tons) submerged
- Length: 57.75 m (189 ft 6 in)
- Beam: 6.74 m (22 ft 1 in)
- Depth: 5.25 m (17 ft 3 in)
- Propulsion: 2 × 450 kW (603 hp) SEMT Pielstick-Jeumont-Schneider Type 12 diesel engines; 2 × 1,000 hp (746 kW) electric motors; 2 shafts
- Speed: 12 knots (22 km/h; 14 mph) surfaced; 8 knots (15 km/h; 9.2 mph) snorkeling; 15 knots (28 km/h; 17 mph) submerged
- Range: 10,000 nmi (19,000 km; 12,000 mi) at 7 knots (13 km/h; 8.1 mph) surfaced
- Endurance: 30 days
- Test depth: 300 m (980 ft)
- Complement: 6 officers; 24 non-commissioned officers; 20 sailors
- Sensors & processing systems: DRUA 31 radar; DUUA 2B sonar; DSUV 2 passive sonar; DUUX acoustic telemeter
- Electronic warfare & decoys: ARUR 10B radar detector
- Armament: 12 × 550 mm (21.7 in) torpedo tubes (8 bow, 4 stern); 12 × torpedoes or missiles

Minerve was a diesel–electric submarine in the French Navy, launched in 1961. The vessel was one of 11 of the Daphné class. In January 1968, Minerve was lost with all hands while returning to her home port of Toulon in bad weather.

Minerve sank two days after the submarine INS Dakar of the Israeli Navy disappeared in the eastern Mediterranean between Crete and Cyprus. Minerve was one of four submarines lost under unclear circumstances in 1968 along with the Soviet submarine K-129, the American USS Scorpion, and Israeli submarine INS Dakar. After more than 50 years missing, the location of the wreck was discovered in 2019, 45 kilometres (24 nmi; 28 mi) south of Toulon.

== Description ==
The Daphné class were second-class submarines, intermediate between the larger, ocean-going submarines of the Narval class and the small, specialised anti-submarine vessels of the Aréthuse class. The design was a development of the Aréthuse class, and was intended to keep the low noise levels and high manoeuvrability of the smaller submarines, while also keeping a small crew and being easy to maintain.

Minerve had an overall length of 57.8 m (190 ft), with a beam of 6.8 m (22 ft) and a draught of 5.25 m (17.2 ft). Displacement was 883 t (869 long tons) surfaced and 1,060 t (1,043 long tons) submerged. The submarine had diesel-electric propulsion, with two 12-cylinder SEMP Pielstick diesel engines rated at a total of 1,300 bhp (970 kW) and one electric motor, rated at 1,600 shp (1,200 kW), which drove two propeller shafts, giving a speed of 13.5 kn (25.0 km/h; 15.5 mph) on the surface and 16 kn (30 km/h; 18 mph) submerged. The ship's machinery and equipment were modular to ease maintenance. Her range was 4,500 nmi (8,300 km; 5,200 mi) at 5 kn (9.3 km/h; 5.8 mph). The submarine was designed to dive to a depth of 300 m (980 ft).

Minerve was fitted with 12 550 mm (21.7 in) torpedo tubes, with eight in the bow and four in the stern. No reload torpedoes were carried. The ship had a crew of 45, composed of six officers and 39 enlisted.

== Service history ==
Minerve was ordered under the 1957 French Naval Estimates, laid down in May 1958 at the Chantiers Dubigeon shipyard in Nantes, and launched on 31 May 1961. After a shakedown cruise to Londonderry Port, Bergen, and Gothenburg in November 1962, the submarine sailed from Cherbourg to Toulon, arriving on 22 December 1962. She was commissioned into the 1st Submarine Squadron on 10 June 1964. Minerve operated exclusively in the Mediterranean Sea. She was refitted at Missiessy Quay, Toulon, in 1967.

== Loss ==
On 27 January 1968, at 07:55 CET, Minerve was travelling just beneath the surface of the Gulf of Lion using her snorkel, roughly 25 nautical miles (46 km; 29 mi) from her base in Toulon, when she advised an accompanying Bréguet Atlantic aircraft that she would be at her berth in about an hour. This proved to be the last time the boat and her crew of 6 officers and 46 enlistees made contact. She disappeared in waters between 1,000 and 2,000 m (3,300 and 6,600 ft) deep.

Commander Philipe Bouillot later said that Minerve's new captain, Lieutenant de vaisseau André Fauve, had spent 7,000 hours submerged over four years on submarines of the same class and had never had a problem. The only plausible cause for her sinking was the weather, which was extremely bad at the time of her loss.

The French Navy launched a search for the missing submarine, mobilizing numerous ships, including the aircraft carrier Clemenceau and the submersible SP-350 Denise under the supervision of Jacques Cousteau. However, they found nothing, and the operation was called off on 2 February 1968. The search for Minerve, under the name Operation Reminer, continued into 1969 and used the submersible Archimède with the U.S. survey ship USNS Mizar.

== Struggle of the families for the truth ==
During the years that followed, the families of Minerve's crew made a concerted effort to find out what had happened. The French Navy did not release any information on the possible causes of the sinking. The file was classified as Secret Défense, which meant that it would not be publicly accessible for 50 years.

After having requested access to the files many times, and having been refused each time, Christophe Agnus, who was the son of Minerve officer Lieutenant Jean-Marie Agnus, obtained an exemption to consult the archives in 2007 at the invitation of Nicolas Sarkozy. Agnus discovered nothing; other families were also granted exemptions, but came to suspect the Navy of concealing evidence that compromised its position.

In 2018, Hervé Fauve, son of Minerve captain André Fauve, appealed to French President Emmanuel Macron to withdraw the Secret Défense status on the Minerve file ahead of schedule. The file had been in the state archives since 1977, and it would not ordinarily have been declassified until 50 years after the date of the last item to be added to the file, which was 1970; thus, the file would not ordinarily have been declassified until 2020. However, there was a risk that the file's secrecy would be automatically renewed on the scheduled date of declassification, and would extend the duration of its classified status until at least 2030. Fauve argued that the file was 'empty' according to those who had consulted it, that no similar submarine was still in use, that the file contained nothing that might endanger the security of the state, and above all that the families of the Minerve officers lived in hope of seeing the declassification of the file.

The French government examined Fauve's request, and the Official Journal of 16 June 2018 announced the declassification of the archival material on the disappearance of the Minerve.

== Relaunch of the search for the wreck ==
On 14 October 2018, the French newspaper Var-Matin reported that, on Hervé Fauve's initiative, eighteen of the families of the 52 sailors of the Minerve had sent an open letter to various elected representatives in the Toulon area to request that the search for Minerve's wreck be resumed. The submarine was the only missing Western submarine from the end of World War II not to have been found. After the publication of Var-Matin's report, Fauve succeeded in mobilising all the families of the crew, active and retired sailors, and the French media, to support the request.

On 5 February 2019, the Minister of the Armed Forces announced the resumption of the search, 50 years after it had been called off. The French government started a new search for Minerve on 4 July 2019 in deep waters about 45 km (28 mi) south of Toulon. On 21 July 2019, Minerve's wreck was discovered by the company Ocean Infinity using the search ship Seabed Constructor.

The wreck was found at a depth of 2,350 m (7,710 ft), broken into three main pieces scattered over a distance of 300 m (980 ft) along the seabed. Although Minerve's sail was destroyed, it was possible to identify the wreckage, as the letters "MINE" and "S" (from Minerve and S647, respectively) were still readable on the hull.

== Memorial ==
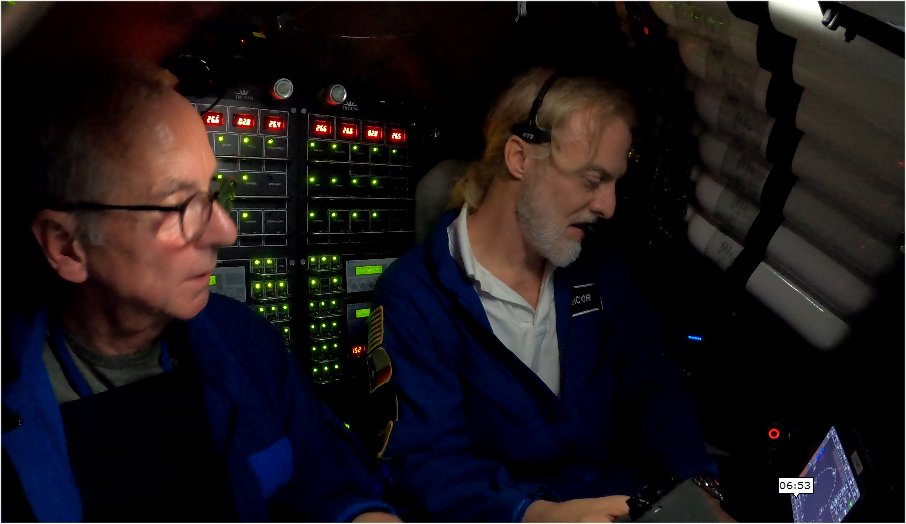
Admiral Jean-Louis Barbier and Victor Vescovo on Minerve dive 1 February 2020

On the day of her discovery, 22 July 2019, Squadron Vice-Admiral Charles-Henri du Ché, responsible for the search, declared that the remains of the submarine would not be disturbed and would become a maritime sanctuary. A ceremony is to be held in the location where Minerve vanished with the relatives of the submariners in attendance.

In December 2019, Victor Vescovo proposed to Fauve a dive on the wreck of the Minerve with his two-seat deep-water submersible DSV Limiting Factor. The Department of Underwater Archaeological Research (DRASSM), a department of the French Ministry of Culture which is responsible for the study and protection of France's underwater heritage, organized the dives on the Minerve wreck.

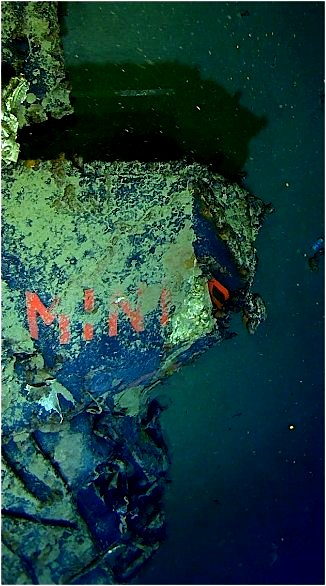
Partial name visible on sail, February 2020

On the first dive, 1 February 2020, Vescovo dived with retired French Rear Admiral Jean-Louis Barbier, who Fauve had contacted, to gather new information on the cause of the sinking.

On the second dive, 2 February, Vescovo piloted while Fauve sat in the second seat. At the bottom they placed a granite memorial plaque on a section of Minerve's hull at a depth of over 2,370 metres (7,780 ft) – to a recording of "La Marseillaise". Vescovo later stated, "As a former naval officer, I was very honored to partner with our French allies…"

== See also ==
- List of submarines of France

== Sources ==
- Blackman, Raymond V. B. (1962). Jane's Fighting Ships 1962–63. London: Sampson Low, Marston & Co., Ltd.
- Couhat, Jean Labayle; Baker, A. D. III, eds. (1986). Combat Fleets of the World 1986/87: Their Ships, Aircraft and Armament. Annapolis, Maryland, USA: Naval Institute Press. ISBN 0853688605.
- Gardiner, Robert; Chumbley, Stephen, eds. (1995). Conway's All the World's Fighting Ships 1947–1995. Annapolis, Maryland: Naval Institute Press. ISBN 1557501327.
