= Mensun Bound =

British maritime archaeologist

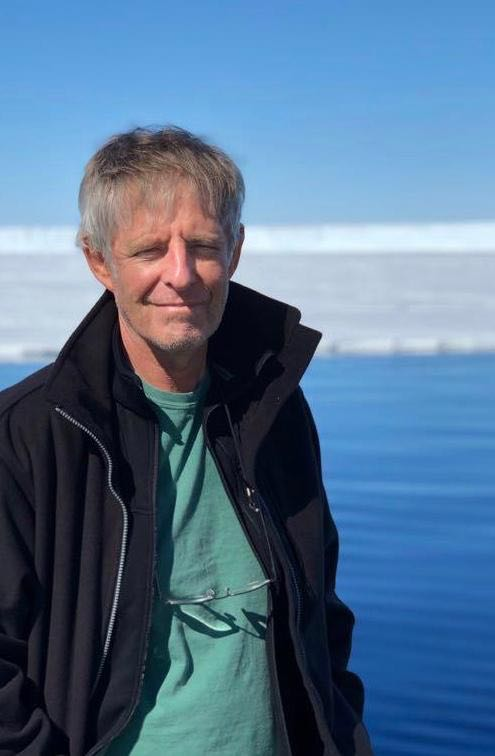
- Born: 4 February 1953 (age 73); Stanley, Falkland Islands

Academic background
- Education: Fairleigh Dickinson University; Rutgers University

Academic work
- Discipline: Underwater archaeology
- Institutions: Oxford University

Mensun Bound (born 4 February 1953) is a British maritime archaeologist born in Stanley, Falkland Islands. He is best known as director of exploration for two expeditions to the Weddell Sea which led to the rediscovery of the Endurance, in which Sir Ernest Shackleton and a crew of 27 men sailed for the Antarctic on the 1914–1917 Imperial Trans-Antarctic Expedition. The ship sank after being crushed by the ice on 21 November 1915. It was rediscovered by the Endurance22 expedition on 5 March 2022.

He is also known for directing the excavation of an Etruscan 6th-century BC shipwreck off Giglio Island, Italy, the oldest known shipwreck of the Archaic era, and the Hoi An Cargo which revolutionized the understanding of Ming-Vietnamese porcelain from Vietnam's art-historical Golden Age.

In 2014–15, Bound led a search for the Imperial German East Asia Squadron, sunk during the Battle of the Falkland Islands in 1914, and since then in AUV and ROV surveys in depths up to 6,000 m. He eventually located the squadron's flagship, SMS Scharnhorst, in April 2019, 105 years after her sinking.

Discovery Channel has called Bound "the Indiana Jones of the Deep".

== Early life and education ==
Bound was born on 4 February 1953 in Stanley, Falkland Islands. He is a fifth-generation Islander whose great-great-grandfather, James Biggs, arrived with the first colonists to Port Louis on the brig Hebe in January 1842. His great-grandfather, William Biggs, was the first to raise the Union Jack when the settlement was moved to Jackson's Harbour (now Port Stanley) in 1843–44. Bound's early education was in the Falkland Islands and Montevideo, Uruguay. After secondary school, he worked at sea on the steam ship Darwin. In 1972, he received a scholarship from the Leopold Schepp Foundation to attend Fairleigh Dickinson University in New Jersey, from where he graduated summa cum laude in ancient history. Whilst undertaking a further degree in Classical art and archaeology at Rutgers University, also in New Jersey, he was a research assistant in Greek pottery at the Metropolitan Museum of Art, New York. In 1976 he was awarded a Commonwealth scholarship to Lincoln College, Oxford University, to study classical archaeology. In 1985, he was given a Junior Research Fellowship at St Catherine's College, Oxford University. At the same time, under the Chairmanship of Alan Bullock, he was appointed Director of Oxford University MARE, the first academic maritime archaeological unit in England. In 1994, he became the Triton Fellow in Maritime Archaeology at St. Peter's College, Oxford. He retired from academic life in 2013 to pursue his interest in deep-ocean archaeology.

== Early archaeological experience ==
Bound's student experience as an archaeologist was on land, where he worked on Roman villa sites outside Rome and various sites in the English Midlands. Bound's underwater archaeological career began in 1979 when he worked for George Bass of the Institute of Nautical Archaeology in Texas on sites off the coast of Turkey. This was followed by the Madrague de Giens shipwreck off the South of France and the Mary Rose in England.

== Principal excavations and surveys ==
- The Giglio wreck. 1981–86. Island of Giglio. Greek or Etruscan wreck from 600 BC at 50 m in Campese Bay, Island of Giglio, discovered in the early 1960s by British diver Reg Vallintine. Between 1982 and 1986, the wreck, Greek or Etruscan, was excavated by an Oxford University team led by Bound.
  Fine wares from the site consisted mainly of Corinthian, Laconian, Ionian and Etruscan fabrics representing a range of shapes. Some were painted with human figures, animals, florals and mythological motifs. The storage jars (amphorae) were of Etruscan, Samian, East Greek and Punic-Phoenician origin; some contained pitch, olives and olive oil. Other finds included amber, lamps, arrowheads, parts of helmets, copper nuggets, iron bars, gaming, bones, musical pipes, a wooden writing plaque, callipers, lead and copper ingots. Surviving ship's timber displayed 'sewn' joinery techniques.
  The entire top floor of the national underwater museum at Porto Santo Stefano is dedicated to the finds from the Giglio ship. The material occupies the entire top floor of the National Underwater Archaeological Museum at Porto Santo Stefano
- Hoi An, Vietnam. 1997–99. The Hội An wreck was a mid-15th century junk that was lost in the South China Sea, 22 kilometres to the west of the Da Nang headland, with a cargo of Vietnamese porcelain that had been made at Cu Dao on the Red River Delta. The Hoi An excavation, licensed by Vietnam's Minister of Culture, was "the deepest, full-scale archaeological excavation ever attempted" (70 to 80 m) and one of the few occasions that saturation diving techniques have been used to excavate a wreck. Involving three large vessels, three deep-ocean tugs, two gun-boats for protection and over 150 people, the excavation took four years and cost US$14 million.
  Diving was a 24-hour operation working at a maximum dive-table depth of 82 metres. Saturation diving techniques were employed in which divers lived in pressurised modules on the deck and were transported to and from the site in a dive-bell. Following the excavation, looting of the site resumed.
  Six different Vietnamese museums have major collections from the wreck on permanent display; the main finds on display in the National Museum, Hanoi.
- German 'pocket' battleship Admiral Graf Spee, River Plate. 1997. Bound conducted the first archaeological survey of the Admiral Graf Spee which was scuttled not far from Montevideo following the Battle of the River Plate in December 1939. In 2004, a salvage operation was launched "with German funding and Uruguayan government backing". The wreck was found by dragging an anchor through the water. A sidescan survey showed that the wreck was upright but heeled to starboard and that she was in two parts, the separation occurring where the after turret had exploded during scuttling operations.
  Following the survey, Bound was given permission by the Uruguayan Navy and Ministry of Culture to recover one of the 5.9-inch guns which is now on display outside the maritime museum in Montevideo.
  In later years, Bound was part of the small team (with Etchegaray, Bado and Sergio Pronczuk) that raised the range-finder (now on display beside the port gates of Montevideo) and the bronze eagle from the ship's stern. Because of the Nazi symbol held within its talons, the eagle's recovery was controversial and after being displayed at a Montevideo hotel for two months, the eagle was moved to storage in a sealed crate in a navy warehouse; a Uruguayan court has now ordered that the eagle must be sold at auction.
- HMS Agamemnon. Maldonado Bay, Uruguay. 1993. 1997–98. In 1997 Bound led a survey of the third rate ship of the line, HMS Agamemnon (built 1781). This was Lord Nelson's first major command, the ship upon which he first fought the French and which, in 1805, was part of his column at Battle of Trafalgar. It was also the ship upon which he first met Lady Hamilton. In 1809, the ship was lost in Maldonado Bay near the mouth of the River Plate. The main result of the survey was the discovery of a cannon which, because of the number on its breach, was confirmed by the Woolwich Arsenal to be the only cannon in existence that can be proven to have been fired in the Battle of Trafalgar. The cannon was conserved in the Uruguayan Navy Yard and is now on display in the Naval museum of Montevideo, Uruguay. Other artefacts on display at the Museum of Buckler's Hard where the ship was built.
- Mahdia Shipwreck, Tunisia. 1993 and 1996. Discovered by Greek sponge divers in 1907. Survey co-directed with Fethi Chelbi of the Inst. Nat. de Patrimoine of Tunisia. 1st century BC Roman wreck with a "huge quantity of antiquities", including seventy Attic marble columns, seven life-sized marble heads and busts, and many bronze sculptures, including a statue of a winged youth and a herm of Dionysus. Early finds on display at the Bardo Museum, Tunis.
- Survey of Punic port, Marsala, Sicily. 1982–83. Co-directed with Professor Giocchino Falsone of Palermo University. Finds consisted mainly of amphorae of Punic and Roman origin, now on display or in storage at the Antiquario, Marsala, along with items of fineware and statuary.
- Survey of reported wreck off the island of Giannutri, Tuscany. 1983. The 'wreck' was found to be an anchorage where sheltering ships discarded their refuse. Amphora and broken tableware of Roman origin covering some 300 years. Material in storage with the Superintendency of Archaeology for Tuscany.
- Survey of Roman wreck in 60m off Punta Fenaio, Island of Giglio. 1983. Ship contained Tubi Fitilli and amphorae of North African origin. Material in storage with the Superintendency of Archaeology for Tuscany.
- Survey of deep-water 6th-century Etruscan wreck off Galbucina Island of Giglio. 1983. Etruscan and Punic amphorae. Material in storage with the Superintendency of Archaeology for Tuscany.
- Falkland Islands. 1983–84. Survey of hulked 19th- and 20th-century sailing ships.
- Roman wreck. Punto Diavolo, Island of Montecristo. 1985–87. Dispersed wreck at 60–75m containing type Pelichét 47 Roma amphorae. Material in storage with the Superintendency of Archaeology for Tuscany.
- Punta Gabiannara, Island of Giglio. 1986. Survey and recovery of Roman wreck remains. Material in storage at Superintendency of Archaeology for Tuscany.
- Datillo wreck, Island of Panarea, Lipari Archipelago, Aeolian Islands. 1986–89. 4th-century BC. Black-glaze fineware (lamps, plates, dishes, bowl, cups) located in a submerged live volcano. Material on exhibition in the Museum of Lipari.
- Survey of 1st-century AD Roman wreck beside the Formiche Rocks, island of Panarea, Aeolian Islands. 1987. Redware and Roman amphorae. Material in storage at the Museum of Lipari.
- Zakynthos, Greece. 1990–92. Co-directed with Katerina Dellaporta. Survey and excavation of wreck from Venetian period. A part of the cargo was hazelnuts. Material in storage at the Ephorate of Underwater Antiquities of Greece.
- Island of Gorgona, Tyrrhenian Sea, Italy. 1990–92. Survey of Byzantine-period wreck off Italian prison island.
- HMS Endymion, Turks and Caicos Islands. 1992. Survey of wreck for National Museum of Turks and Caicos.
- Gibraltar. 1992–93. 1995. Survey of cannon site in front of port. Conducted for the Museum of Gibraltar.
- Rhyl, Wales. 1992–93. Survey of hulked 19th-century sailing ships.
- Salvador. River Plate, Uruguay. Early 19th-century ammunition ship. Work ceased when site was found to contain a large quantity of human remains. Was in collaboration with the Uruguay Government's Department of Patrimony.
- Bound Skerry, Shetland Islands 1993–94. Co-directed with Tim Sharpe. Danish warship Wrangels Palais, lost 1687. Material in storage at Shetland Museum.
- Alderney Elizabethan wreck. 1993–2013. Co-directed with Mike Bowyer. Elizabethan wreck carrying cargo of munitions from the wars in France. Three cannons recovered and variety of Tudor weaponry, pottery and Tudor remains. Cannon, swords, muskets, powder flasks, armour: on display or in storage at the Alderney Museum.
- Hulked Cape Horn sailing ships around Falklands, South Georgia and Patagonia. 1994. General survey. In particular the Jhelum, Charles Cooper and Lady Elizabeth in Port Stanley and the Vicar of Bray at Goose Green.
- Straits of Malacca. 1995. In 1993, while searching for an English vessel, Bound discovered four shipwrecks from the Battle of Cape Rachado, fought between the Dutch and Portuguese fleets in 1606. In 1995, he was contracted by the National Museum of Malaysia to conduct an excavation. Weaponry, pottery, silver 8 real coinage. All material in storage or on display in the National Museum of Malaysia.
- Cape Verde Islands 1998–2001. Co-advisor with Margaret Rule on survey of three wreck sites around the archipelago.
- Fort San Sebastian wreck, island of Mozambique, East Africa. 2001–03. Blue and white Ming porcelain, trade beads and gold. Under license and in collaboration with the Ministry of Culture, Maputo,
- Southern Oceans. Led a five-month search in depths of up to 300 meters in the Southern Ocean for Graf von Spee's lost fleet from 1914. In December 2019, it was announced he had located the wreck of SMS Scharnhorst.
- Weddell Sea Expedition 2019. Director of exploration. The main task of the expedition was the study of the Larsen C Ice Shelf and second attempting to find Ernest Shackleton's ship, Endurance, which sank under the ice in 1915. Although they succeeded in cutting through the pack to the point where the Endurance sank, the hunt had to be abandoned when the autonomous underwater vehicle (AUV) conducting the seabed search failed to arrive at a programmed rendezvous point with the ship.
- Weddell Sea, Antarctica, 2022. Director of exploration for Endurance22 expedition based aboard S. A. Agulhas II, searching for the wreck of the Endurance, flagship of Sir Ernest Shackleton's Imperial Trans-Antarctic Expedition. The expedition discovered the ship in "remarkable condition" on 5 March 2022.

== Publications ==
Bound has authored or edited over 100 articles and several books on archaeology. In October 2022, Bound's account of the two expeditions to the Weddell Sea which led to the rediscovery of Shackleton's Endurance was published under the title The Ship Beneath the Ice by Pan Macmillan. A five-star review of the book by Simon Griffith of The Mail on Sunday said the "narrative cracks along with the pace of a well-crafted thriller" while Robert Crampton in The Times called it "gratifyingly long on logistical detail, correspondingly short on flights of fancy". In 2024, Simon & Schuster published Wonders in the Deep, a history of the world told through shipwrecks and the artefacts found on them, co-authored by Bound and travel writer Mark Frary. Bound's other books include Excavating Ships of War (ed.), Lost Ships (Simon & Schuster), The Archaeology of Ships of War, Archeologia Sottomarina alle Isole Eolie, (Pungitopo) and A Ship Cast Away about Alderney with Jason Monaghan. Books about Bound's work include Dragon Sea by F. Pope (Penguin Books) on the South China Sea excavation; Tarquin's Ship (Souvenir Press) by A McKee, on the Giglio ship excavation. Also, children's book The Search for the Oldest Shipwrecks in the World by D. Thornton tells the story of the Giglio ship.

== Other activities and awards ==
Bound is a trustee of the Falkland Islands Foundation, the World Ship Trust, the Council of the Nautical Archaeology Society, the Alderney Maritime Trust, the Friends of the Falklands Museum and the Falkland Islands Maritime Heritage Trust.

He has organised four international conferences on maritime archaeology (two-day conference at the National Maritime Museum on 'The Archaeology of Ships of War'; two day conference on 'Fresh Water Archaeology', Univ. of Bangor; 'Maritime Archaeology in Italy', Inst. Archaeology, London; 'Metals from the Sea', Oxford). He is a Fellow of the Explorers Club, New York.

He has lectured widely on maritime archaeology for the British Council, and a range of museums, universities, learned societies, archaeological organisations and cruise ships. Has edited a book series, held Visiting Fellowships (University of North Wales), conducted coursework and been a doctoral examiner. His awards include 'Diver of the Year, Italy' 1985, and in 1992 he received the Colin McLeod medallion from the British Sub Aqua Club for 'Furthering international co-operation in diving'.

== Documentaries ==
Bound's work has been the focus of many documentaries in England, Italy and the US, including an award-winning, four-part series entitled Lost Ships by the Discovery Channel, which covered the Agamemnon, the Hoi An wreck, the Graf Spee and the Mahdia ship. The BBC has made several documentaries on Bound's work including Queen Elizabeth's Lost Guns, about the recovery, replication and test-firing of an Elizabethan iron cannon from the Alderney wreck. Lost Ships - The Hunt for the Kaiser's Superfleet, produced by TVT Productions for Smithsonian Channel, covers Bound's search for the lost fleet from the Battle of the Falkland Islands in 1914.
