= Hung Hua Construction =

Taiwanese construction company

- Native name: 宏華營造股份有限公司
- Headquarters: North, Taichung, Taiwan
- Website: Official website

Hung Hua Construction (HCC; Chinese: 宏華營造股份有限公司; pinyin: Hóng Huá Yíngzào Gǔfèn Yǒuxiàn Gōngsī) is a major Taiwanese construction contractor which specializes is coastal and offshore work.

== Overview ==
Hung Hua Construction is the largest maritime engineering company in Taiwan.

They are based in Taichung, Taiwan.

== History ==
HCC helped Jan De Nul set up their operations in Taiwan and has partnered with them on a number of projects.

== Fleet ==
HCC has the largest fleet of nearshore working vessels in Taiwan. In 2019 HCC ordered a pair of crew transfer vessels from Damen Group. The two vessels were delivered in January 2021 with a third ordered.

A number of HCC's vessels are operated by wholly owned subsidiary Dong Fang Offshore (DFO).

=== Vessels ===
- DF Buffalo, 330 ft barge
- Orient No. 8, Anchor handling tug
- Falcon No. 5, Damen FCS 2710
- Falcon No. 6, Damen FCS 2710

== Awards ==
The Taiwanese Public Construction Commission has awarded HCC two Gold Quality Medals and High Distinction Award.
