= Orient Constructor =

Taiwanese vessel

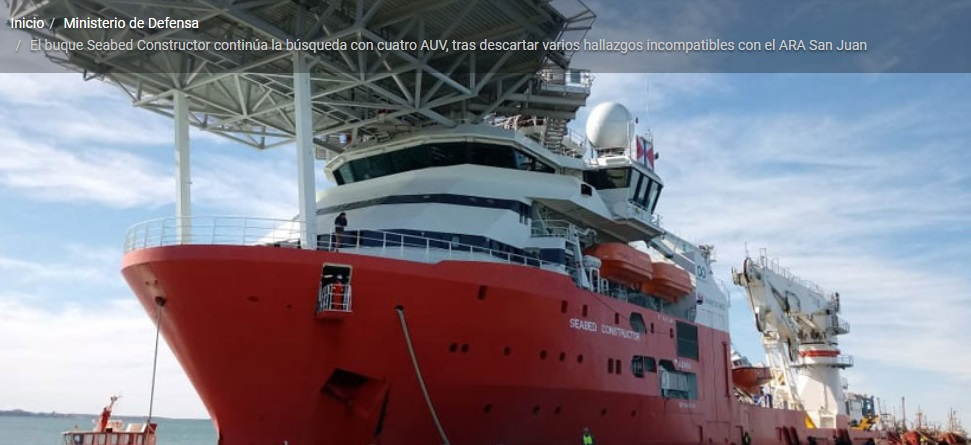

History
- Name: Olympic Athene; Seabed Constructor; Orient Constructor
- Owner: Dong Fang Offshore / Hung Hua Construction
- Port of registry: Taichung, Taiwan
- Builder: Kleven Verft AS
- Launched: 2013
- Completed: 2014
- Identification: IMO number: 9682148
- Status: Operational

General characteristics
- Class & type: MT6022 MK II subsea support and construction vessel
- Tonnage: 7,883 GT; 6,480 DWT
- Length: 115.4 m (379 ft)
- Beam: 22 m (72 ft)
- Draught: 7.135 m (23.41 ft)
- Decks: 7
- Ice class: ICE-C
- Installed power: 5 x Caterpillar 2230 ekW
- Propulsion: Electric
- Speed: 12.5 kn (23.2 km/h; 14.4 mph) service 16 kn (30 km/h; 18 mph) max

Orient Constructor is an offshore construction and maintenance vessel owned since 2021 by Dong Fang Offshore (DFO), a subsidiary of Taiwan's Hung Hua Construction, based in Taichung, Taiwan.

Previously known as Seabed Constructor, Olympic Athene and originally Olympic Boa, the ship was launched in 2013. The ship is designed to conduct geophysical and geotechnical surveys of the seabed, support the construction or demolition of underwater structures, conduct trenching and excavation operations, and serve as a ROV platform for autonomous underwater vehicles and unmanned surface vehicles. The ship is 114 metres (374 ft) in length, with a 22 metres (72 ft) beam, a gross tonnage of 7,883, and deadweight tonnage of 6,480 metric tons. Its maximum speed is 14.1 knots (26.1 km/h; 16.2 mph).

Under its previous name Seabed Constructor, the ship participated in the search for Malaysia Airlines Flight 370. It was operated by Ocean Infinity on a 90-day search contract for the missing aircraft; the mission ended unsuccessfully in mid-June 2018. Seabed Constructor was then contracted by the Argentine Navy to search for the missing submarine ARA San Juan. On 17 November 2018, Seabed Constructor found San Juan a year and two days after the submarine's disappearance. The submarine lies on the seabed at a depth of 920 metres (3,020 ft) below sea level. On 22 July 2019, the French government announced that drones launched from Seabed Constructor had found the French submarine Minerve, lost at sea in 1968. On 4 December 2019, search teams from Seabed Constructor located the wreckage of SMS Scharnhorst, the flagship of the German Empire's East Asia Squadron during World War I, at a depth of 1,610 m (5,280 ft), some 98 nmi (181 km; 113 mi) southeast of the Falkland Islands.
