= Voyage data recorder =

Watercraft electronic recording system

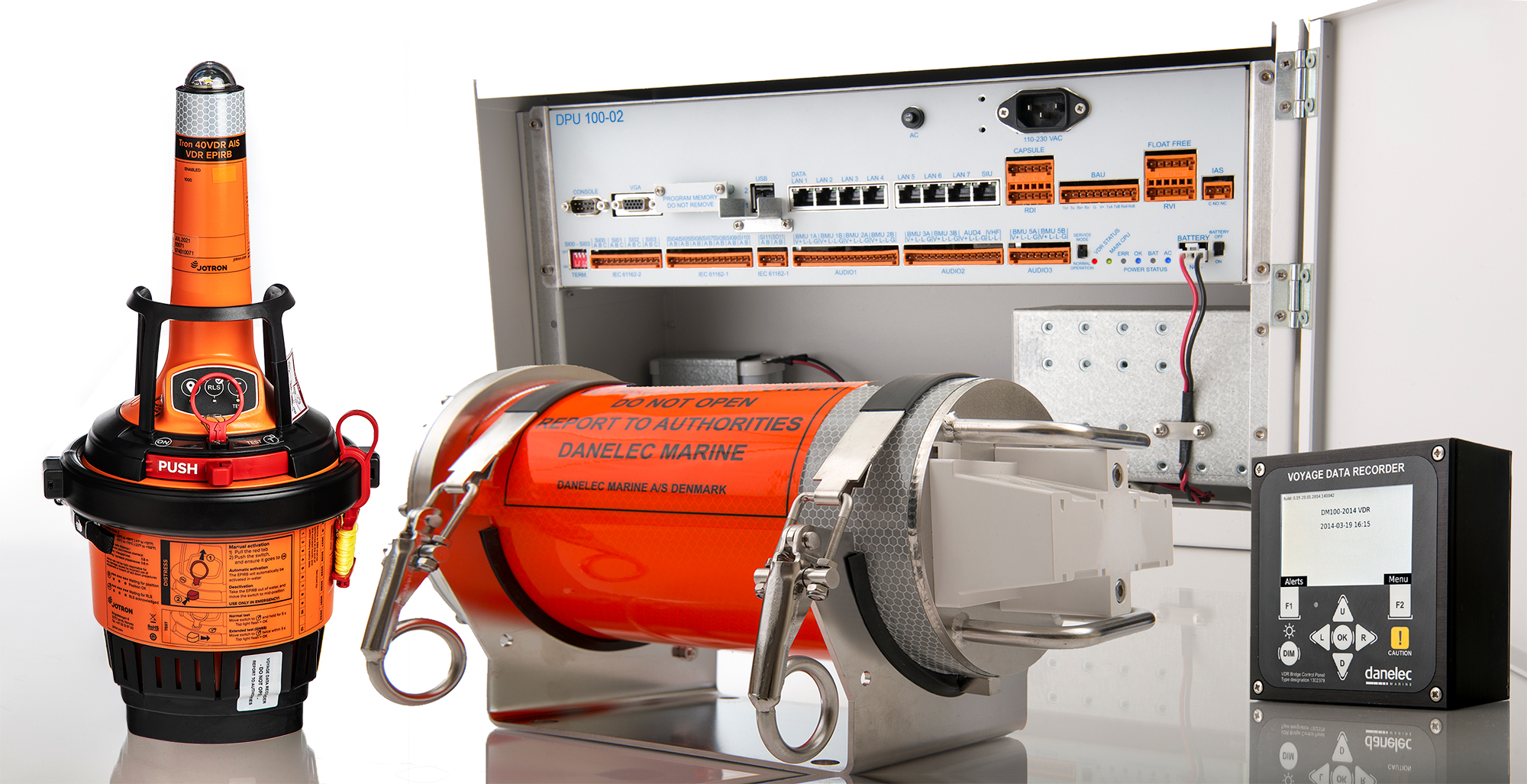
Overview of a voyage data recorder (VDR) system showing Danelec DM100 VDR G2's data acquisition unit, float-free capsule, fixed capsule and bridge control panel. The system is designed to meet SOLAS requirements for recording and protecting shipboard data.

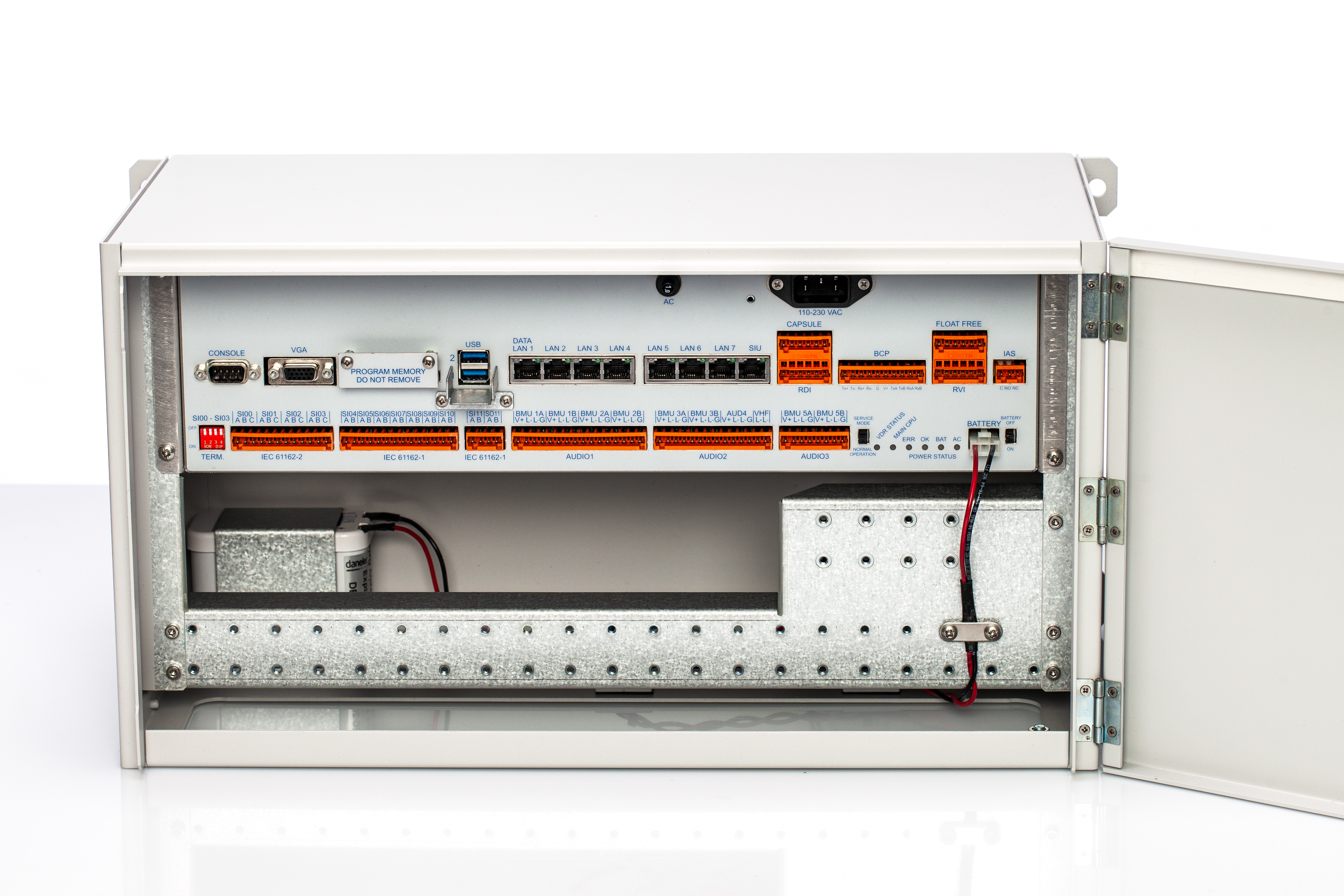
The data acquisition unit (DAU) of a voyage data recorder. It collects data from various shipboard sensors and transmits it to the recording unit.

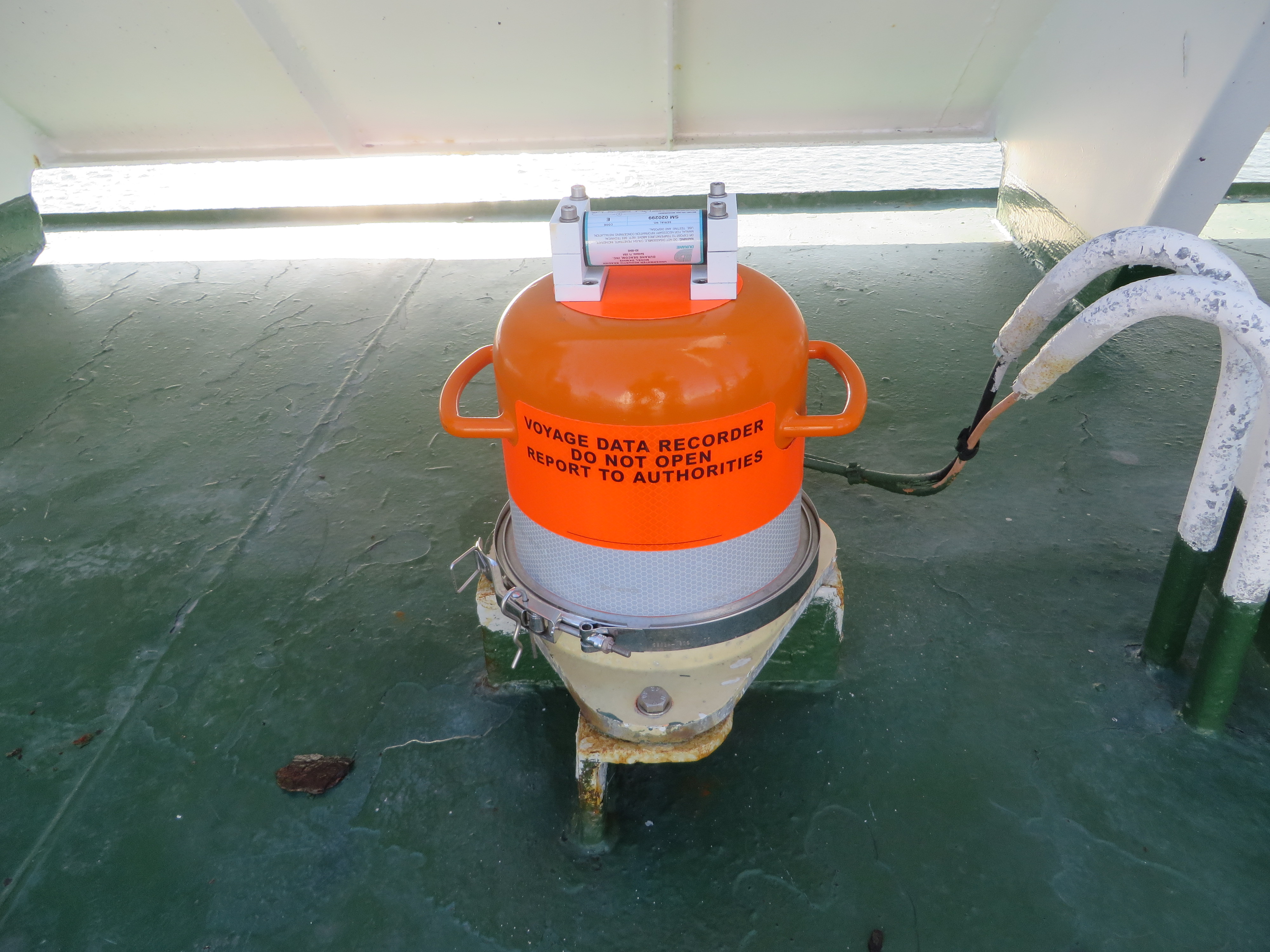
The protective capsule of a voyage data recorder on M/V Barfleur

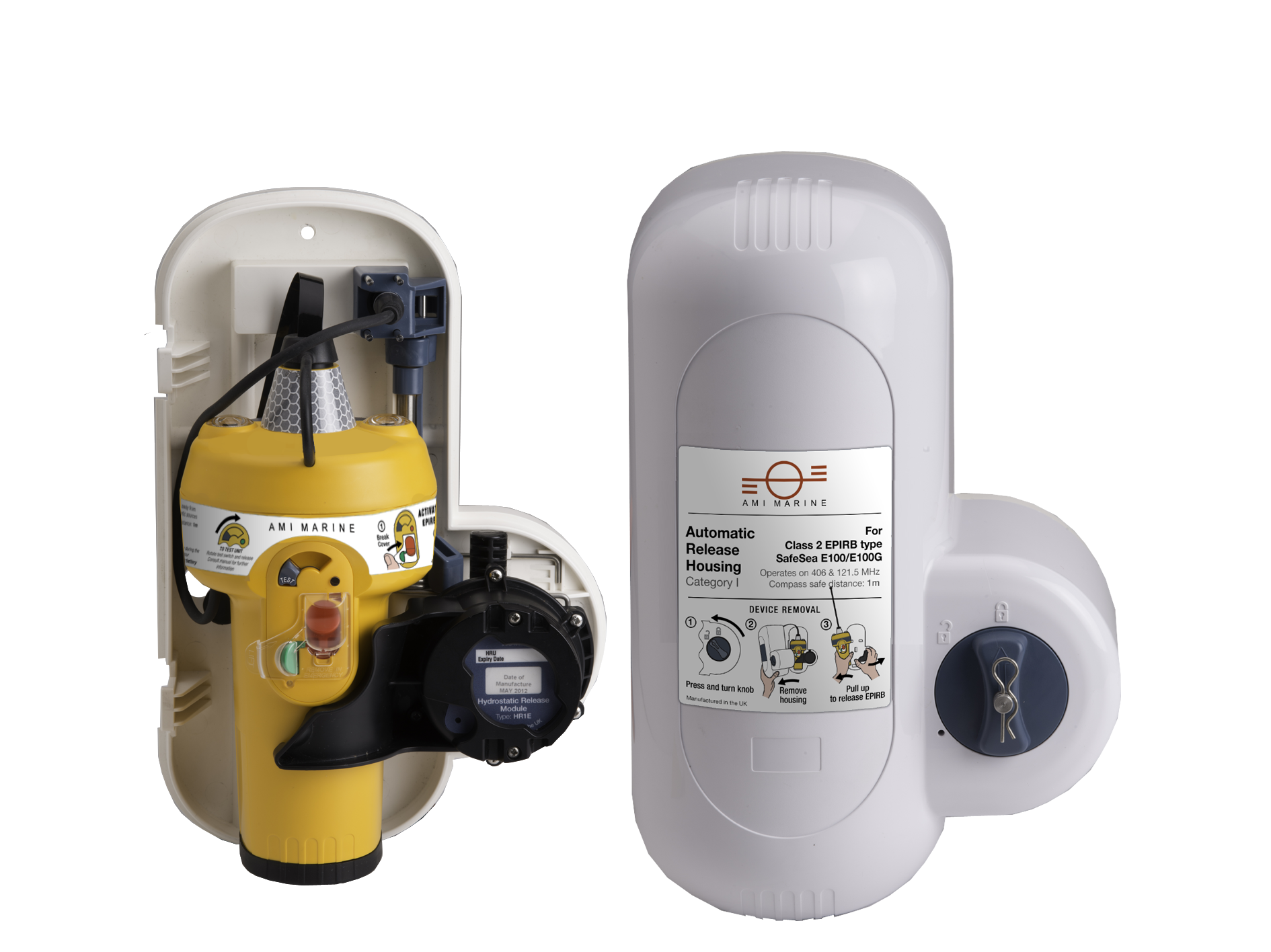
This image shows the AMI Marine ltd float free capsule used on ships to store a minimum of 48 hours of recorded data. if the vessel sinks the capsule case (white) will open and release the yellow capsule from inside, this capsule will then float to the surface and emit a distress signal to alert shore side authorities.

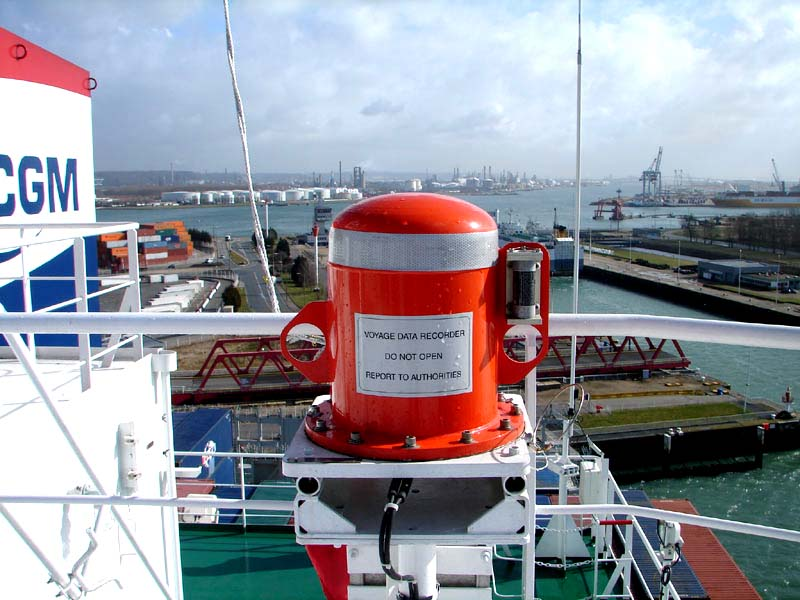
A fixed data capsule of VDR mounted on a container ship

A voyage data recorder, or VDR, is a data recording system designed for all vessels required to comply with the IMO's International Convention SOLAS Requirements (IMO Res.A.861(20)) in order to collect data from various sensors on board the vessel. It then digitizes, compresses and stores this information in an externally mounted protective storage unit. The protective storage unit is a tamper-proof unit designed to withstand the extreme shock, impact, pressure and heat, which could be associated with a marine incident (fire, explosion, collision, sinking, etc.).

Passenger ships and ships other than passenger ships of 3000 gross tonnage and upwards constructed on or after 1 July 2002 must carry voyage data recorders (VDRs) to assist in accident investigations, under regulations adopted in 2000, which entered into force on 1 July 2002.

When the ship sinks in a marine accident, the protective storage unit may be in a retrievable fixed unit or free float unit (or combined with EPIRB). The last 12 hours (48 hours for the 2014 regulations MSC.333(90)) of stored data in the protected unit can be recovered and replayed by the authorities or ship owners for incident investigation. Besides the protective storage unit, the VDR system may consist of a recording control unit and a data acquisition unit, which are connected to various equipment and sensors on board a ship. The new MSC.333(90) regulations also state a minimum of 30 days of recorded data must be held internally (this could be within the recording control unit, data acquisition unit, or main electronics unit depending on the manufacturers terminology).

Although the primary purpose of the VDR is for accident investigation after the fact, there can be other uses of recorded data for preventive maintenance, performance efficiency monitoring, heavy weather damage analysis, accident avoidance and training purposes to improve safety and reduce running costs.

A simplified voyage data recorder (S-VDR), as defined by the requirements of IMO Performance Standard MSC.163(78), is a lower cost simplified version VDR for small ships with only basic ship's data recorded.

== Notable incidents ==
One of the most significant demonstrations of the value of voyage data recorders occurred with the loss of the U.S.-flagged cargo vessel SS El Faro, which sank on October 1, 2015, during Hurricane Joaquin with the loss of all 33 crew. The vessel’s VDR was located and recovered from a depth of 15,250 feet (4,650 meters), one of the deepest recoveries of such a device to date.

The device contained more than 26 hours of bridge audio recordings and sensor data, which enabled investigators to reconstruct the vessel’s final hours in detail. The NTSB concluded that the data provided critical insight into navigational decisions, weather information gaps, and organizational safety management practices.

The incident led to regulatory and procedural recommendations from the NTSB, including enhancements in bridge resource management, improved access to real-time weather data, and stricter oversight of safety management systems. The El Faro case highlighted the importance of robust VDR standards in aiding post-incident investigations and driving maritime safety improvements worldwide.

== Voyage data ==
The information recorded in the unit(s) (sometimes also called the ship's black box) may include the following information:

- Position, date, time using GPS
- Speed log – speed through water or speed over ground
- Gyro compass – heading
- Radar* – as displayed or AIS data if no off-the-shelf converter available for the radar video
- ECDIS* – a screen capture every 15 seconds and a list of navigational charts in use every 10 minutes or when a chart change occurs
- Audio from the bridge, including bridge wings
- VHF radio communications
- Echo sounder* – depth under keel
- Main alarms* – all IMO mandatory alarms
- Hull openings* – status of hull doors as indicated on the bridge
- Watertight and fire doors* status as indicated on the bridge
- Hull stress* – accelerations and hull stresses
- Rudder* – order and feedback response
- Engine/propeller* – order and feedback response
- Thrusters* – status, direction, amount of thrust % or RPM
- Anemometer and weather vane* – Wind speed and direction

Data marked with * may not be recorded in S-VDR, except radar and echo sounder if data and standard interfaces available.

== See also ==
- Event data recorder
- Emergency position-indicating radiobeacon station (EPIRB)
- Emergency locator beacon
- Flight recorder
- Train event recorder
