= Hieu =

Hieu or Hiếu is a given name. Notable people with the name include:

- Hieu (abbess), Irish abbess
- Bùi Thanh Hiếu (b. 1972), Vietnamese human rights activist
- Bùi Văn Hiếu (b. 1989), Vietnamese footballer
- Hieu Van Le (b. 1954), 35th governor of South Australia
- Lê Bật Hiếu (b. 1984), Vietnamese footballer
- Hieu Ngoc Ma (b. 1957), birth name of Tony Ma, Vietnamese-American poker player
- Hieu Minh Ngo (b. 1989), Vietnamese cyber security specialist
- Hieu Minh Nguyen, Vietnamese-American poet
- Nguyễn Huy Hiệu (b. 1947), Vietnamese Colonel General
- Nguyễn Khắc Hiếu (1889–1939), Vietnamese author under the pen name Tản Đà
- Nguyễn Mạnh Hiếu (b. 1966), birth name of Vincent Nguyen, Vietnamese-Canadian bishop
- Nguyễn Trung Hiếu (b. 1979), Vietnamese sports shooter
- Nguyễn Văn Hiếu (1929–1975), South Vietnamese Major General
- Phạm Trung Hiếu (b. 1998), Vietnamese footballer
- Phan Văn Hiếu (b. 2000), Vietnamese footballer
- Trần Hiếu (b. 1936), Vietnamese singer
- Trần Quang Hiếu (1938–1985), Vietnamese artist
- Trần Trung Hiếu (b. 1993), Vietnamese name of Geoffrey Kizito, Ugandan-Vietnamese footballer
- Hieu C. Truong (b. 1941), Vietnamese-Canadian engineer
- Trong Hieu (b. 1992), German singer
- Vũ Minh Hiếu (b. 1972), Vietnamese footballer
- Vũ Minh Hiếu (b. 2002), Vietnamese footballer
- Vương Trung Hiếu, (b. 1959), Vietnamese author

== See also ==
- Hiếu, East Asian tradition
