= Rewards for Justice Program =

Interagency rewards program

Rewards For Justice
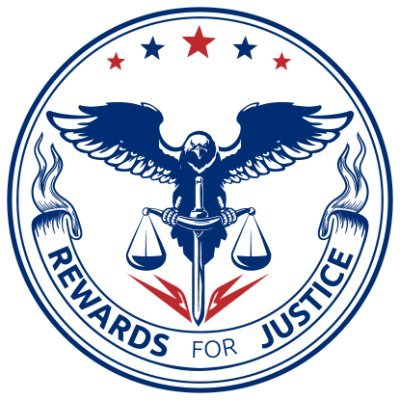
- Seal of the Rewards For Justice Program

Agency overview
- Formed: June 6, 1984; 42 years ago
- Preceding agencies: Department of Defense (DOD); U.S. Department of Air Force; Central Intelligence Agency; Federal Bureau of Investigation; National Security Agency (NSA); Cybersecurity and Infrastructure Security Agency (CISA)
- Type: Counterterrorism
- Jurisdiction: United States government
- Motto: Stop a Terrorist and Save Lives
- Parent department: U.S. Department of State Diplomatic Security Service
- Child agencies: Department of Defense Cyber Crime Center (DC3); Air Force Office of Special Investigations (AFOSI); Naval Criminal Investigative Service (NCIS); Army Criminal Investigation Command (ACIS)
- Website: www.rewardsforjustice.net

The Rewards for Justice Program (RFJ) is the United States' national security interagency program that offers reward for information leading to the location or an arrest of leaders of terrorist groups, financiers of terrorism, including any individual that abide in plotting attacks carried out by foreign terrorist organizations. RFJ directly addresses the foreign threat by identifying entities such as key leaders and financial mechanism of the foreign terrorist organizations. The Rewards for Justice Program is managed by the Department of State, Bureau of Diplomatic Security. Rewards for Justice is seeking information for individuals who operate under terrorist groups or terrorist organizations that participate in launching cyber-attacks against United States critical infrastructure such as electrical grids and renewable energy resources from United States Presidential election interferences.

== History ==
On December 22, 2011, Rewards for Justice announced a reward of up to $10 million for information leading to Ezedin Abdel Aziz Khalil (aka Yasin al-Suri), the leader of an al-Qaeda fundraising network in Iran that transfers money and recruits via Iranian territory to Pakistan and Afghanistan. It marked the first time that Rewards for Justice offered a reward for information leading to a terrorist financier. The program was established by the 1984 Act to Combat International Terrorism (Public Law 98-533), and it is administered by the U.S. State Department's Bureau of Diplomatic Security. The Rewards for Justice Program was formerly known as the Counter-Terror Rewards Program, soon shortened to the HEROES program. In 1993, DS launched www.heroes.net to help publicize reward information. By 1997, the site was getting more than one million hits a year from 102 countries. Smith is also credited with the idea to put photos of wanted terrorists on matchbook covers. DSS agents assigned to embassies and consulates throughout the world ensured that the matchbooks got wide distribution at bars and restaurants. The secretary of state is currently offering rewards for information that prevents or favorably resolves acts of international terrorism against U.S. persons or property worldwide. Rewards also may be paid for information leading to the arrest or conviction of terrorists attempting, committing, conspiring to commit, or aiding and abetting in the commission of such acts. As of 2022, The Rewards for Justice program has paid more than $250 million to 125 individuals for leading information that prevented international terrorist attacks or helped bring to justice those involved in prior acts.

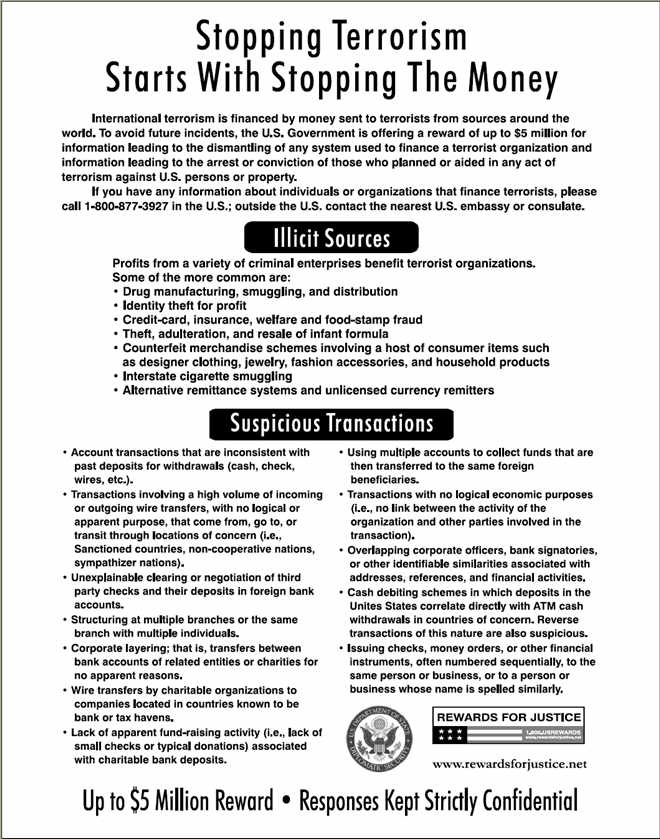
A Rewards for Justice bounty post

After the September 11 attacks, the list of wanted terrorists increased dramatically, and rewards were also increased, as part of the U.S. efforts to capture al-Qaeda leadership. However, the plan has been largely ineffective against Islamic terrorists. The largest reward offered was $25 million for the leader of al-Qaeda, Osama bin Laden, and his deputy, Ayman al-Zawahiri, which had "attracted hundreds of anonymous calls but no reliable leads." Osama bin Laden was shot and killed inside a private residential compound in Abbottabad, Pakistan, by members of the United States Naval Special Warfare Development Group and Central Intelligence Agency operatives in a covert operation on May 2, 2011.Robert A. Hartung, assistant director of Diplomatic Security's Threat Investigations and Analysis Directorate, announced on September 2, 2010 that the U.S. Department of State's Rewards for Justice program is offering rewards of up to $5 million each for information that leads law enforcement or security forces to Hakimullah Mehsud and Wali ur Rehman. Former U.S. secretary of state Hillary Clinton presented a list of "the five most wanted terrorists" to Pakistan; the list included Ayman al-Zawahiri, Mohammed Omar, Ilyas Kashmiri, Atiyah Abd al-Rahman and Sirajuddin Haqqani. Each of these five had bounties issued against them by the program; however, Kashmiri, who US Intelligence officials said they were 99% sure was killed in an airstrike in South Waziristan on June 3, 2011, was removed from the list. Rahman was killed in an airstrike in North Waziristan in August 2011. Omar died of tuberculosis in Karachi, Pakistan, in April 2013. Al-Zawahiri was killed in a drone strike in Kabul, Afghanistan, in July 2022.

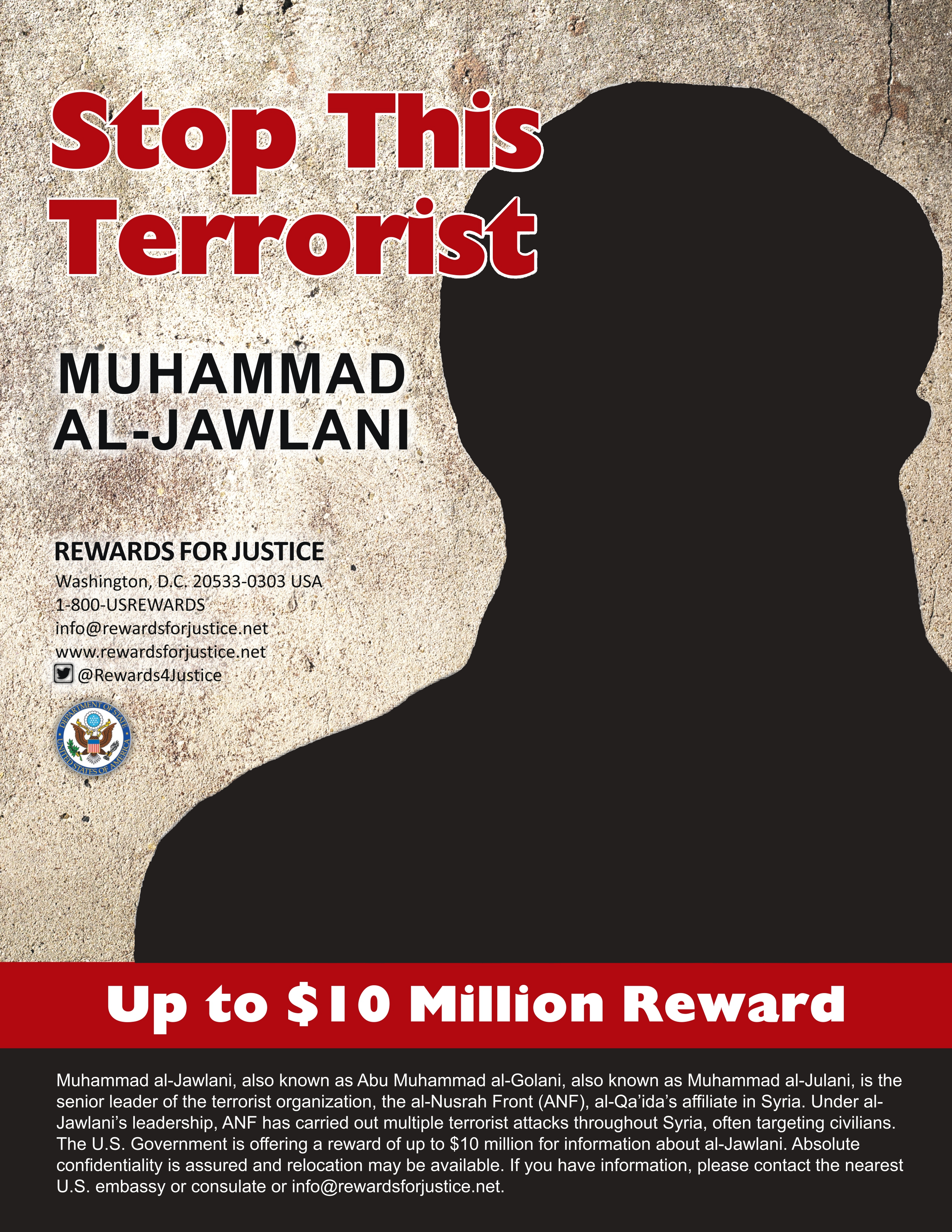
Redacted Rewards for Justice poster for Abu Mohammad al-Julani, now known as Ahmed al-Sharaa, with the photographic portrait removed due to copyright concerns.

On 10 May 2017, the Rewards for Justice program announced a $10 million reward for information leading to the identification or location of Abu Mohammad al-Julani, now known as Ahmed al-Sharaa, the president of Syria, who was identified by the program as the leader of the al-Nusra Front. The Rewards for Justice program described this as the first reward offer for a leader of the al-Nusra Front, the Syrian branch of al-Qaeda. In December 2024, following the fall of the Assad regime, the United States rescinded a seven-year-old $10 million Rewards for Justice bounty for information leading to al-Sharaa's capture after he met with a U.S. delegation—the first formal U.S. diplomatic presence in Syria in more than a decade—with U.S. Assistant Secretary of State for Near Eastern Affairs Barbara A. Leaf stating that the decision was made to initiate dialogue with Hay'at Tahrir al-Sham(HTS) and noting that, during discussions in Damascus, al-Sharaa committed to preventing ISIS and other terrorist groups from operating within Syria.

== RFJ Most Wanted ==
On August 10, 2022, a federal jury located within the United States District Court for the District of New Jersey in Newark, New Jersey, indicted Mansour Ahmadi, Ahmad Khatibi Aghda, and Amir Hossein Nickaein Ravari on charges of conspiracy to commit wire fraud related to recent activity in connection with computers, intentional damage to a protected computer, and transmitting a demand in connections to damaging a protected computer. The Rewards for Justice Program announced $10 million dollar through the approval of the United States Department of State administered by the United States Department of Treasury the amount offered on information in regard to the location or whereabouts of Islamic Revolutionary Guard Corps (IRGC) also known as the Iranian cyber actors. During the press conference, the FBI asked for the help of public in seeking information for hackers. Later in the day, the FBI and Rewards for Justice had then uploaded a flyer for Mansour Ahmadi, Ahmad Khatibi Aghda, and for Amir Hossein Nickaein Ravari.

Name	Terrorist Organization(s)	Terrorist Activity
Ahmad Khatibi Aghda	Islamic Revolutionary Guard Corps Electronic Warfare	Indicted of conspiracy charges to commit wire fraud related to recent activity in connection with computers, intentional damage to a protected computer, and transmitting a demand in connections damaging a protected computer
Amir Hossein Nickaein Ravari	Islamic Revolutionary Guard Corps Electronic Warfare	Indicted of conspiracy charges to commit wire fraud related to recent activity in connection with computers, intentional damage to a protected computer, and transmitting a demand in connections damaging a protected computer
Mansour Ahmadi	Islamic Revolutionary Guard Corps Electronic Warfare	Indicted of conspiracy charges to commit wire fraud related to recent activity in connection with computers, intentional damage to a protected computer, and transmitting a demand in connections damaging a protected computer
Mahdi Lashgarian	Islamic Revolutionary Guard Corps Cyber-Electronic Command; IRGC-CEC; IRGC Jangal Organization; Islamic Revolutionary Guard Corps Electronic Warfare and Cyber Defense Organization; Mr. Soul	Participated in malicious cyber activities against United States critical infrastructure in violation of the Computer Fraud and Abuse Act (CFAA)
Milad Mansuri	Islamic Revolutionary Guard Corps Cyber-Electronic Command; IRGC-CEC; IRGC Jangal Organization; Islamic Revolutionary Guard Corps Electronic Warfare and Cyber Defense Organization; Mr. Soul	Participated in malicious cyber activities against United States critical infrastructure in violation of the Computer Fraud and Abuse Act (CFAA)
Mohammad Amin Saberian	Islamic Revolutionary Guard Corps Cyber-Electronic Command; IRGC-CEC; IRGC Jangal Organization; Islamic Revolutionary Guard Corps Electronic Warfare and Cyber Defense Organization; Mr. Soul	Participated in malicious cyber activities against United States critical infrastructure in violation of the Computer Fraud and Abuse Act (CFAA)
Mohammad Bagher Shirinkar	Islamic Revolutionary Guard Corps Cyber-Electronic Command; IRGC-CEC; IRGC Jangal Organization; Islamic Revolutionary Guard Corps Electronic Warfare and Cyber Defense Organization; Mr. Soul	Participated in malicious cyber activities against United States critical infrastructure in violation of the Computer Fraud and Abuse Act (CFAA)

== Announcements ==
In April 2020, Rewards for Justice Program offered $5 million for information leading to identify North Korean hackers who target United States critical infrastructure. The National Security Agency (NSA) and other U.S. foreign organizations released a joint Cybersecurity Advisory to expose the advanced persistent threat (APT) actors sponsor by Chinese government targeting critical infrastructure, social infrastructure, telecommunications, government websites, transportation, electrical grids and military infrastructures globally in an announced by NSA to counter any malicious threat actors. This CSA is being released by the following agencies and organizations of a respective government and intelligence agency outlined by United States Intelligence Agency. The CSA, "Countering Chinese State-Sponsored Actors Compromise of Networks Worldwide to Feed Global Espionage System, "on tactic, techniques and procedures (TTPs) by malicious actors for using initial exploitation, persistence and exploitation.

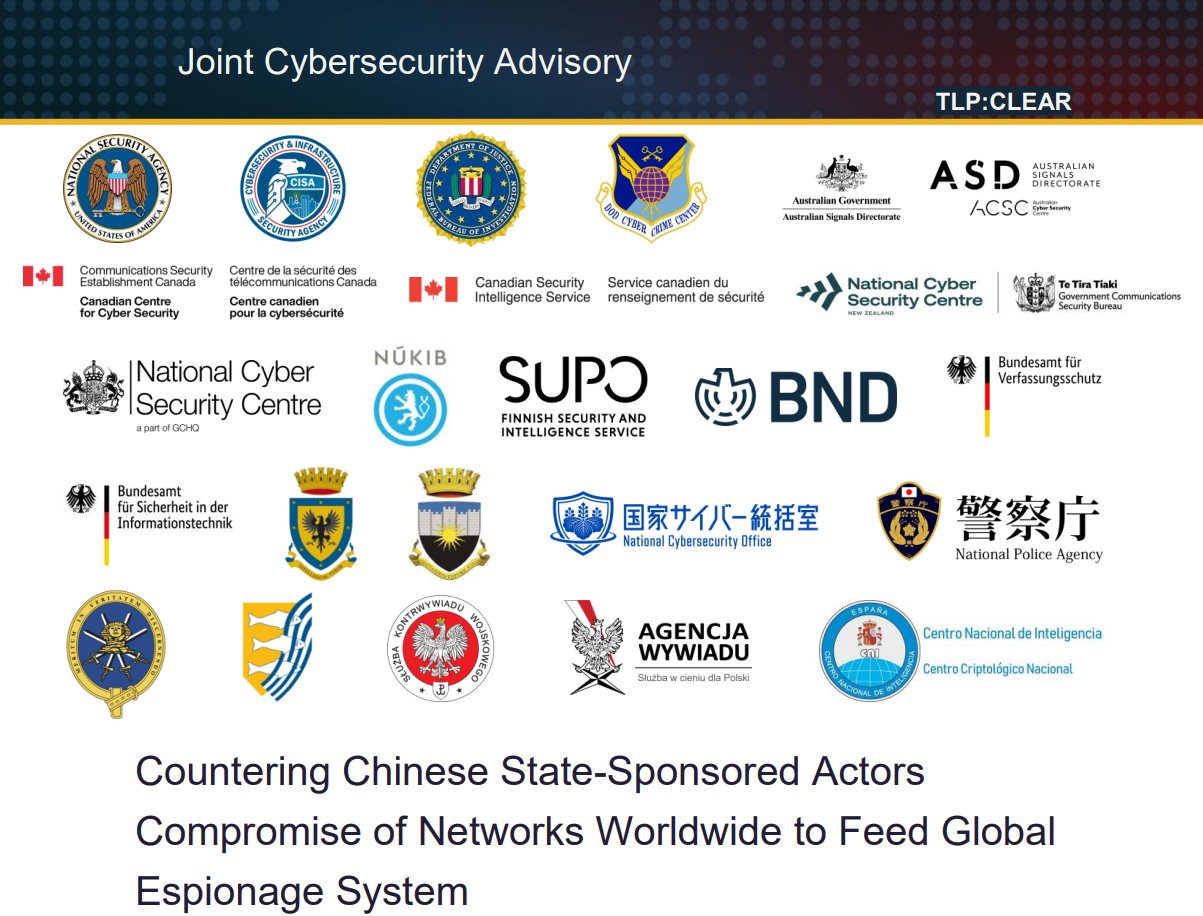
The National Security Agency (NSA) and Department of Defense (DOD) uploaded an announcement for new intelligence agencies which jointed Joint Cybersecurity Advisory.

- United States National Security Agency (NSA)
- United States Cybersecurity and Infrastructure Security Agency (CISA)
- United States Federal Bureau of Investigation (FBI)
- United States Department of Defense Cyber Crime Center (DC3)
- United States Air Force Office of Special Investigations (AFOSI)
- United States Naval Criminal Investigative Service (NCIS)
- Army Criminal Investigation Command (ACIS)
- Australian Signals Directorate's Australian Cyber Security Centre (ASD's ACSC)
- Canadian Centre for Cyber Security (Cyber Centre)
- Canadian Security Intelligence Service (CSIS)
- New Zealand National Cyber Security Centre (NCSC-NZ)
- United Kingdom National Cyber Security Centre (NCSC-UK)
- Czech Republic National Cyber and Information Security Agency (NÚKIB)
- Finnish Security and Intelligence Service (SUPO)
- Germany Federal Intelligence Service (BND)
- Germany Federal Office for the Protection of the Constitution (BfV)
- Germany Federal Office for Information Security (BSI)
- Italian External Intelligence and Security Agency (AISE)
- Italian Internal Intelligence and Security Agency (AISI)
- Japan National Cyber Office (NCO)
- Japan National Police Agency (NPA)
- Netherlands Defence Intelligence and Security Service (MIVD)
- Netherlands General Intelligence and Security Service (AIVD)
- Polish Military Counterintelligence Service (SKW)
- Polish Foreign Intelligence Agency (AW)
- Spain National Intelligence Centre (CNI)

== See also ==
- Diplomatic Security Service
- FBI Most Wanted Terrorists
- Narcotics Reward Program
