= 2024 global telecommunications hack =

2024 cyberattack by China

On August 27, 2024, The Washington Post reported that at least two major internet service providers in the United States had been compromised by Chinese hackers. It was later reported that the hackers affected at least nine telecommunications firms in the U.S., including AT&T, Verizon, Lumen Technologies, and T-Mobile, and had also affected dozens of other countries. The hackers were able to access metadata of users' calls and text messages, including date and time stamps, source and destination IP addresses, and phone numbers from over a million users, including staff of the Kamala Harris 2024 presidential campaign, as well as phones belonging to Donald Trump and JD Vance. The hackers were also able to access wiretapping systems used to conduct court-authorized wiretapping. The attack was later attributed to the Salt Typhoon advanced persistent threat actor linked to China's Ministry of State Security (MSS).

== Initial access ==
The attackers exploited zero-day vulnerability in Versa Director (Versa Networks) and vulnerabilities in unpatched Fortinet and Cisco network devices and routers, targeting core network components. They also gained access to a high-level network management account that was not protected by multi-factor authentication. Hijacking router(s) inside AT&T's network then gave them access to over 100,000 routers from which further attacks could be launched.

It is believed that the hackers had access to the networks for over a year before the intrusions were detected by threat researchers at Microsoft.

== Impact ==
On December 27, 2024, deputy national security advisor Anne Neuberger stated in a White House press conference that the total list of affected telecom companies now stood at 9 after a "hunting guide" was distributed to "key telecom companies" which details how to identify this type of intrusion.

Companies confirmed to have been breached in this attack are:

- Verizon
- T-Mobile
- AT&T
- Lumen Technologies (formerly CenturyLink)
- Charter Communications
- Consolidated Communications
- Windstream Communications

=== Call records ===
A high priority for the attackers was records of phone calls made by people who work in the Washington D.C. metro area. These records corresponded to over a million users and included: date and time stamps, source and destination IP addresses, phone numbers and unique phone identifiers. According to Anne Neuberger, a "large number" of the individuals whose data was directly accessed were "government targets of interest."

=== Wiretapping systems ===
The hackers compromised telecom systems used to fulfill CALEA requests used by U.S. law enforcement and intelligence agencies to conduct court-authorized wiretapping. The hackers obtained an almost complete list of phone numbers being wiretapped. Officials said having this information would help China know which Chinese spies the United States have identified.

=== Presidential election ===
In October, Donald Trump's campaign was notified that phones used by Trump and JD Vance may have been affected by the hack as well as the staff of the Kamala Harris 2024 presidential campaign.

== Response ==
According to Foreign Policy, the attack has "hardened anti-China consensus" in the U.S. government. Senator Mark Warner, chairman of the U.S. Senate Select Committee on Intelligence, called the intrusion the "worst telecom hack in our nation's history", describing it as making prior cyberattacks by Russian actors look like "child's play" by comparison.

Matthew Pines, director of intelligence at SentinelOne, stated that "the Salt Typhoon hacks will be seen as the worst counterintelligence breach in U.S. history" which "gives MSS bread crumbs to trace back to and cauterize strategically critical U.S. sources and methods." He suggested the data breach is worse than the 2015 hack of the U.S. Office of Personnel Management carried out by the MSS' Jiangsu State Security Department.

In retaliation for the attack, the U.S. Department of Commerce announced it would ban the remaining U.S. operations of China Telecom. The Department of Defense placed Chinese media conglomerate Tencent, shipping giant COSCO, battery manufacturer CATL, semiconductor manufacturer ChangXin Memory Technologies, and drone maker Autel Robotics on a blacklist of "Chinese military companies". The designation can disqualify U.S. businesses which transact with listed companies from future U.S. government contracts.

The Chinese Embassy in Washington, D.C. claimed the allegations were all U.S. efforts to "smear and slander" China.

On October 9, the Electronic Frontier Foundation issued a press release stating how any lawful wiretapping system can be compromised by attackers and that "there is no backdoor that only lets in good guys and keeps out bad guys".

On December 4, 2024, the CISA, FBI, and cybersecurity agencies from New Zealand, Canada, and Australia jointly released a guide for hardening network infrastructure titled Enhanced Visibility and Hardening Guidance for Communications Infrastructure. The agencies urged network engineers, particularly ones at telecom companies, to implement the security best practices described therein.

On December 10, Senator Ron Wyden released a draft of the Secure American Communications Act, a bill which would order the FCC to require telecoms to adhere to a list of security requirements and perform annual tests to check for vulnerabilities. Wyden claimed that "it was inevitable that foreign hackers would burrow deep into the American communications system the moment the FCC decided to let phone companies write their own cybersecurity rules".

On January 17, 2025, the U.S. Treasury Department's Office of Foreign Assets Control sanctioned Yin Kecheng of Shanghai and Sichuan Juxinhe Network Technology Co. Ltd. as having "direct involvement" in Salt Typhoon.

On January 20, shortly after Trump retook office, acting Secretary of Homeland Security Benjamine Huffman signed a memo abolishing all DHS advisory boards. This included the Cyber Safety Review Board, which was investigating the hack and preparing a report on how to prevent future attacks.

== See also ==
- Cyberwarfare and China
