= Charming Kitten =

Iranian government cyber-espionage organization

- Formation: c. 2004–2007
- Type: Advanced persistent threat
- Purpose: Cyberespionage, cyberwarfare
- Region served: Middle East
- Methods: Zero-days, spearphishing, malware, Social Engineering, Watering Hole
- Members: At least 5
- Official language: Persian
- Parent organization: IRGC
- Affiliations: Rocket Kitten APT34 APT33
- Formerly called: APT35; Turk Black Hat; Ajax Security Team; Phosphorus

Charming Kitten, also called APT35 (by Mandiant), Phosphorus or Mint Sandstorm (by Microsoft), Ajax Security (by FireEye), and NewsBeef (by Kaspersky) is an Iranian government cyberwarfare group, described by several companies and government officials as an advanced persistent threat (APT).

The United States Cybersecurity and Infrastructure Security Agency (CISA) has identified Charming Kitten as one of several Iranian state-aligned actors that target civil society organizations, including journalists, academics, and human rights defenders, in the United States, Europe, and the Middle East, as part of efforts to collect intelligence, manipulate discourse, and suppress dissent.

The group is known to conduct phishing campaigns that impersonate legitimate organizations and websites, using fake accounts and domains to harvest user credentials.

== VIP human solution ==
The entire national mass surveillance "Kashef" database software and its domain " built by the IRGC CYBER COM to spy on Iranian public was hacked in 2025 as well real life identities of the entire chain of command from the hacker groups, with its CEO main runner of a front corporation "Amn Afzar company " being IRGC commander Nilofar Bagheri.

National mass surveillance software used by Unit40, by Iran International
- https://vimeo.com/1137702960/faabbbf3a4

== History ==
=== Witt defection (2013) ===
In 2013, former United States Air Force technical sergeant and military intelligence defense contractor Monica Witt defected to Iran and was charged by the US Justice Department in February 2019 with spying for the Iranian government. Prosecutors alleged that she gave Iran "target packages" with details on her former colleagues. In a 2017 report, the Israeli cybersecurity firm ClearSky concluded with medium certainty that Behzad Mesri, one of the Iranian hackers indicted alongside her, was linked to Charming Kitten.

=== HBO cyberattack (2017) ===
In 2017, following a cyberattack on HBO, a large-scale joint investigation was launched on the grounds that confidential information was being leaked. A conditional statement by a hacker going by alias Sokoote Vahshat (Persian سکوت وحشت lit. 'Silence of Fear') said that if money was not paid, scripts of television episodes, including episodes of Game of Thrones, would be leaked. The hack caused a leak of 1.5 terabytes of data, some of which was shows and episodes that had not been broadcast at the time. HBO has since stated that it would take steps to make sure that they would not be breached again.

Behzad Mesri was subsequently indicted for the hack. He has since been alleged to be part of the operational unit that had leaked confidential information.

According to Certfa, Charming Kitten had targeted US officials involved with the 2015 Iran Nuclear Deal. The Iranian government denied any involvement.

=== Second indictment (2019) ===
A federal grand jury in the United States District Court for the District of Columbia indicted Witt on espionage charges (specifically "conspiracy to deliver and delivering national defense information to representatives of the Iranian government"). The indictment was unsealed on February 19, 2019. In the same indictment, four Iranian nationals—Mojtaba Masoumpour, Behzad Mesri, Hossein Parvar and Mohamad Paryar—were charged with conspiracy, attempting to commit computer intrusion, and aggravated identity theft, for a campaign in 2014 and 2015 that sought to compromise the data of Witt's former co-workers.

In March 2019, Microsoft took ownership of 99 DNS domains owned by the Iranian government-sponsored hackers, in a move intended to decrease the risk of spear-phishing and other cyberattacks.

=== Media impersonation campaign (2019-2020) ===
In 2020, Reuters reported that Charming Kitten targeted critics of the Iranian government, academics, and journalists, such as Erfan Kasraie and Hassan Sarbakhshian, who received fake interview requests designed to harvest email credentials. The emails impersonated reporters from outlets like The Wall Street Journal, CNN, and Deutsche Welle, sometimes asking recipients to enter Google passwords or sign bogus contracts. Cybersecurity firms Certfa, ClearSky, and Secureworks attributed the operation to Charming Kitten based on tactics, infrastructure, and targeting.

=== 2020 election interference attempts (2019) ===
According to Microsoft, in a 30-day period between August and September 2019, Charming Kitten made 2,700 attempts to gain information regarding targeted email accounts. This resulted in 241 attacks and 4 compromised accounts. Although the initiative was deemed to have been aimed at a United States presidential campaign, none of the compromised accounts were related to the election.

Microsoft did not reveal who specifically was targeted, but a subsequent report by Reuters claimed it was Donald Trump's re-election campaign. This assertion is corroborated by the fact that only the Trump campaign used Microsoft Outlook as an email client.

Iran denied any involvement in election meddling, with the Iranian Foreign Minister Mohammad Javad Zarif stating "We don’t have a preference in your election [the United States] to intervene in that election," and "We don’t interfere in the internal affairs of another country," in an interview on NBC's "Meet The Press".

Cybersecurity experts at Microsoft and third-party firms such as ClearSky Cyber Security maintain that Iran, specifically Charming Kitten, was behind the attempted interference, however. In October 2019, ClearSky released a report supporting Microsoft's initial conclusion. In the report, details about the cyberattack were compared to those of previous attacks known to originate from Charming Kitten. The following similarities were found:

- Similar victim profiles. Those targeted fell into similar categories. They were all people of interest to Iran in the fields of academia, journalism, human rights activism, and political opposition.
- Time overlap. Verified Charming Kitten activity was ramping up within the same timeframe that the election interference attempts were made.
- Consistent attack vectors. The methods of attack were similar, with the malicious agents relying on spear-phishing via SMS texts.

=== Operational exposure (2020) ===
In 2020, IBM’s X-Force IRIS team uncovered over 40GB of data from Charming Kitten, including training videos showing operatives hacking email and social media accounts. The footage included access to accounts of US and Hellenic Navy personnel, failed phishing attempts on US officials, and use of tools like Zimbra to manage stolen credentials. Researchers described the discovery as a rare insight into the group’s methods and suggested it showed limited ability to bypass multi-factor authentication.

=== HYPERSCRAPE data theft tool (2022) ===
On August 23, 2022, a Google Threat Analysis Group (TAG) blog post revealed a new tool developed by Charming Kitten to steal data from well-known email providers (i.e. Google, Yahoo!, and Microsoft). This tool needs the target's credentials to create a session on its behalf. It acts in such a way that using old-style mail services looks normal to the server and downloads the victim's emails, and does some changes to hide its fingerprint.

Per the report, the tool is developed on the windows platform but not for the victim's machine. It uses both command line and GUI to enter credentials or other required resources like cookies.

=== Activist targeting in Europe (2023) ===
In September 2023, Germany’s domestic intelligence agency issued a public warning about “concrete spying attempts” by the Iranian-linked hacker group Charming Kitten, according to The Guardian. The report followed incidents documented across several European countries in which Iranian activists experienced hacking attempts, cyberattacks, online harassment, and threats of physical harm. Activists in Germany, France, the UK, and Spain were reportedly warned by local authorities about threats allegedly linked to Iranian cyber actors.

== See also ==
- Sony Pictures hack
- Monica Witt
