= Liminal Panda =

LIMINAL PANDA is an advanced persistent threat specialising in targeting telecommunications companies. Some of the actions of the group had previously been attributed to LightBasin. The group is suspected of being sponsored by the Chinese government.
