= Vương Trung Hiếu =

Vietnamese writer

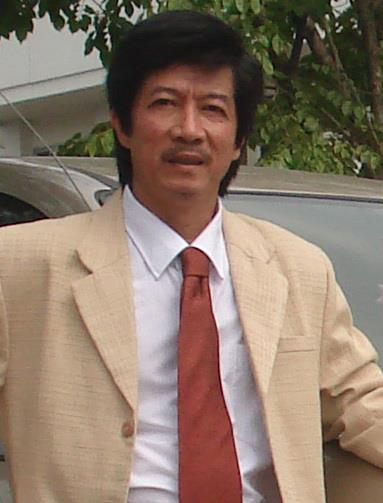
- Born: September 7, 1959 (age 67); An Giang province
- Occupations: Writer, translator
- Writing career
- Pen name: Vương Trung Hiếu
- Period: 1987–present

Vương Trung Hiếu (born 1959) is a Vietnamese fiction writer, journalist, translator, and interdisciplinary scholar. He is the author of more than two hundred books (including genre writing; novels; anthologies and translations). Many of his works are published under the pseudonym Thoai Son.

== Biography ==
Vuong Trung Hieu was born on 7 September 1959. As a boy, he lived in Long Xuyen, Vietnam, with his parents, who were both teachers. He is the eldest in a family of eight children. He attended the primary school for male students in Long Xuyen named Thoai Ngoc Hau High School. In 1975, he and his family moved to Thoai Son, a district twenty-eight kilometers from Long Xuyen.

In 1977, not wishing to leave his home district, Vuong took the entrance examination to the An Giang College of Pedagogy and studied literature there. After finishing college in the 1980s, he and his siblings by turn entered universities in Ho Chi Minh City. Vuong earned a BA in Vietnamese Literature and a BA in English from the University of Ho Chi Minh City (now Ho Chi Minh City University of Social Sciences and Humanities). In 1991, he earned an MA in Historical Science from the Institute of Social Science in Ho Chi Minh City.

Vuong Trung Hieu is fluent in English, French and Chinese. He began his writing career in 1987 with many articles for newspapers and magazines on Art, Literature, Youth, Philosophy and Women. These articles were published in newspapers and magazines in Ho Chi Minh City and in regions of South Vietnam.

Vuong Trung Hieu lived in Ho Chi Minh City for twenty-five years before moving to Cantho city after his marriage in 2008. Since 2011, he and his wife have been living in Bangkok, Thailand.

== Evaluation ==
Before becoming a writer, editor and a translator, Vuong Trung Hieu was an active journalist. His articles were considered artistic and filled with humanity. They appeared in periodicals in Ho Chi Minh city, in An Giang and the other provinces in the Mekong Delta.

In order to make a greater contribution to the discipline of writing, Vuong Trung Hieu stated that to perfect his professional knowledge of the art, it was necessary to study from real life and the traditions of national history. After many years of hard work, Vuong obtained a degree of Master of Arts in Historical Science. With his knowledge and enthusiasm for gathering information, studying and synthesising it, Vuong wrote a series of books on editing and translation, which made a great impression to readers in the field of research.

== Published books ==
=== Novels ===
- Tình khúc hồng (Love Song), Youth Publishing House, 1991.
- Ngày chúng mình quen nhau (The Day We First Met), Labour Publishing House, 1991.
- Hương Quỳnh (The Perfume of Quynh Flowers), 2 volumes – Labour Publishing House, 1992.
- Đêm tóc rối (Untidy Hair in the Night), 2 volumes, under the pen-name Uyen Uyen – Thuanhoa Publishing House, 1993.

=== Famous sayings ===
- Danh ngôn Đông phương (Famous Eastern Sayings), compiled by Hoai Anh, Ho Si Hiep, Vuong Trung Hieu, and other writers – Youth Publishing House, 1991.
- Danh ngôn tình yêu-hôn nhân- gia đình (Famous Sayings on Love - Marriage - Family), Vietnamese-English – French trilingual, compiled by Vuong Trung Hieu and Ngo Chanh – Ho Chi Minh City Publishing House, 1993.
- Danh ngôn Đông Tây (Famous Western and Eastern Sayings), French – Vietnamese bilingual, compiled by Vuong Trung Hieu and Tran Đuc Tuan- Đanang Publishing House, 1994.
- Hán học danh ngôn (Famous Chinese Sayings), Chinese – Vietnamese bilingual – Arts and Literature Publishing House, 2002.
- Danh ngôn thế giới ( Famous Sayings in the World), English – Vietnamese bilingual – Ho Chi Minh City Publishing House, 1995.
- Lời vàng trong kinh doanh (Golden Sayings in Business) – Women Publishing House, 1997.
- Tư tưởng nhân loại (Human Thoughts)- Youth Publishing House, 2001.

=== Psychology, marriage, and family ===
- Chuyện tình của các danh nhân (Famous People's Loves) by Vuong Trung Hieu and other authors), 4 volumes – Youth Publishing House, 1989.
- Bạn gái và tình yêu (Ladies and Love) – Dongnai Publishing House, 1995.
- Nghệ thuật sống hạnh phúc (How to live Happily) – Camau Publishing House, 1996.
- Con đường đi tới thành công (Ways to Success) – Women Publishing House, 1996.
- Để giữ hạnh phúc gia đình (To Remain Happy in the Family) – Women Publishing House, 1997.
- Nuôi dạy con bạn cần biết (Things to Remember in Bringing up Children) – Ho Chi Minh City Publishing House, 1997.
- Xã giao văn minh và lịch sự (Civilized and Polite Courtesy) – Camau Publishing House, 1998.
- Hiểu người hiểu ta (Self and Mutual Understanding)- Thuanhoa Publishing House, 1998.
- Họ trở thành tỷ phú như thế nào (How They Become Billionaires) – Ho Chi Minh City Publishing House, 1999.
- Tâm sinh lý bạn trẻ (Youth Psychophysiology) – Dongnai Publishing House, 1999.
- Nghệ thuật chinh phục lòng người (How to Win People's Trust)- Danang Publishing House, 2000.
- Chuyện tình danh nhân (Famous People's Love) – Dongnai Publishing House, 2001.
- Thay đổi cuộc sống trong 7 ngày (The Palm-Aire Spa 7-Day Plan to Change Your Life) by Eleanor Berman, translated by Vuong Trung Hieu – Dongnai Publishing House, 2002.
- 80 điều cần làm để trở thành ông chủ lớn (80 Things You Must Do To Be A Great Boss) by David Freemantle, translated by Vuong Trung Hieu – Youth Publishing House 2003.
- Mang thai và những điều cần biết (Pregnancy and what you need to know) – Women Publishing House, 2007.
- Chăm sóc dinh dưỡng cho trẻ (Care on Nutrition for Children) – Women Publishing House, 2007.

=== Folk literature ===
- Tục ngữ Việt Nam chọn lọc (Selected Vietnamese Proverbs) – Arts and Literature Publishing House, 1996.
- Tục ngữ các nước trên thế giới (Proverbs in the World) – Camau Publishing House, 2000.
- Kho tàng truyện trạng Việt Nam (Treasury of Stories on First Doctoral Candidates in VietNam), 5 volumes – Camau Publishing House, 2001.
- Những tập tục kỳ lạ trên thế giới (Strange Habits in the World) – Camau Publishing House NXB Mũi Cà Mau, 2001.
- Ca dao Việt Nam, ca dao tình yêu (Folksongs and Love Folksongs in VietNam) – Dongnai Publishing House, 2006.

=== Cultivation and breeding ===
- Kỹ thuật nuôi gà chăn thả (The Technique of Breeding Chicken on the Pasture), pseudonym Thoai Son – Dongnai Publishing House, 2003.
- Kỹ thuật nuôi gà công nghiệp (The Technique of Breeding Chicken in Series), pseudonym Thoai Son – Dongnai Publishing House, 2003.
- Kỹ thuật nuôi baba, lươn, ếch và cá rô đồng (The Technique of Breeding Tortoises, Eels and Land Anabas), pseudonym Thoai Son – Dongnai Publishing House, 2003.
- Nuôi heo năng suất cao (Breeding Pigs for Good Production), pseudonym Thoai Son – Dongnai Publishing House, 2003.
- Kỹ thuật nuôi dê (The Technique of Breeding Goats), pseudonym Thoai Son – Dongnai Publishing House, 2003.
- Kỹ thuật trồng và tạo dáng cây cảnh (The Technique of Cultivating and Trimming Ornamental Plants) – Youth Publishing House, 2005.
- Tìm hiểu 154 giống chó thuần chủng (To Know 154 species of Purebred Dogs) – Dongnai Publishing House, 2006.
- Kỹ thuật nuôi thỏ (The Technique of Breeding Rabbits) – Dongnai Publishing House, 2006.
- Kỹ thuật trồng và tạo dáng cây mai (The Technique of Cultivating and Trimming Vietnamese Mai plants) – Labour Publishing House, 2006.
- Kỹ thuật nuôi cá rô phi (The Technique of Breeding African Carp), pseudonym Thoai Son, Dongnai Publishing House, 2006.
- Kỹ thuật nuôi cá tra và cá ba sa (The Technique of Breeding Pangasius Catfish and Basa Pangasius Catfish), pseudonym Thoai Son – Dongnai Publishing House, 2006.
- Kỹ thuật nuôi cá chép và cá mè (The Technique of Breeding Carps and Hypophthalmichthys Fish) – Dongnai Publishing House, 2007.
- Kỹ thuật nuôi cá La hán, cá dĩa, cá rồng, cá vàng, cá xiêm và cá bảy màu (The Technique of Breeding Flower Horns, Symphysodon Fish, Arowanas, Goldfish, Betta Fish, and Guppies) – Labour Publishing House, 2007.
- Nuôi dạy chó theo khoa học (The Science of Training Dogs) – Orient Publishing House, 2008.

=== Other types of writing ===
- Giây phút khôn ngoan (Minute of the Wisdom), English – Vietnamese bilingual – Art and Literature Publishing House, 1996.
- Những chuyện lý thú về máy vi tính (Amusing Stories about Computers) – Women Publishing House, 1998.
- Ảo thuật- Trò chơi vui lạ (Jugglery, an Interesting and Strange Game), pseudonym Thoai Son, Dongnai Publishing House, 2001.
- Những thủ pháp ảo thuật (Modes of Jugglery) – Dongnai Publishing House, 2003.
- Để có trí nhớ tốt (To Have a Good Memory) – Dongnai Publishing House, 2004.
- Xây dựng nhà cửa theo phong thủy (Building Houses with Feng shui) – Labour Publishing House, 2007.
- Nhân tướng học (Physiognomy) – Information and Culture Publishing House, 2007.
- Ứng dụng phong thủy trong tình yêu, công danh, sự nghiệp (Application of Feng Shui to Love – Fame – Career) – Information and Culture Publishing House, 2008.
- Bí ẩn điềm chiêm bao (Secret of Dreams) – Dongnai Publishing House, 2009.
- Chữa bệnh theo kinh nghiệm dân gian (Treatment according to Popular Experience) – Women Publishing House, 2011.
