= Bùi Thanh Hiếu =

Vietnanese human rights activist and blogger

Bùi Thanh Hiếu (born February 6, 1972) is a Vietnamese human rights activist and blogger under the username Người Buôn Gió. (lit. 'Wind Merchant'). In 2009, Bùi was detained for ten days by the Vietnamese government for "abusing democratic freedoms to infringe upon the interests of the State." As of 2021 he lives in exile in Germany with his son.

== Early life ==
Bùi Thanh Hiếu was born in 1972 in a small alley in the Đồng Xuân Market in Hanoi, in an area he called "the street of life, a place containing many elements of Gypsy, Mafia".

Growing up Hiếu had a rough life, earning money to live through theft, gambling, and collecting debt for rent.

== Blogging career ==
In 2005, after noticing corruption in the hospital where his wife gave birth, he began seeing it as a persistent problem in society. He started his blog hoping to contribute to bettering the lives of his children and of future generations. His writings have criticized territorial claims within China, as well as Vietnam's handling of land disputes with the Catholic Church, and advocated for democracy in Vietnam.

== Arrest ==
In 2009, Hiếu along with two other Vietnamese bloggers, were detained by the Vietnamese government for "abusing democratic freedoms to infringe upon the interests of the State." Hiếu distributed shirts which contained the phrase "Hoang Sa - Truong Sa belong to Vietnam." Hoang Sa refers to the Paracel Islands and Truong Sa refers to the Spratly Islands.

== Exile to Germany ==
In 2010, his writings were translated into German and he was awarded a full scholarship from the German government in 2013. Hiếu was originally supposed to be in Germany for six months to study art. However he would end up staying there for years and continued to write about Vietnamese politics on his Wind Trader blog and on Facebook. In February 2020, Hiếu announced he would stop producing the Wind Trader blog due to harassment of his family in Vietnam, including his 86 year old mother who at the time was in a Vietnamese hospital. In February 2021, Amnesty International reported that Hiếu was targeted by four spyware attacks by OceanLotus between February 2018 and December 2019.

== Awards ==
In 2010, Hiếu was awarded the Hellman-Hammett award by Human Rights Watch along with five other Vietnamese writers. The award is given to "writers around the world who are targets of political repression or human rights violations."

== See also ==
- Human rights in Vietnam
- Mother Mushroom
