= Cyberspace =

Concept describing a widespread, interconnected digital technology

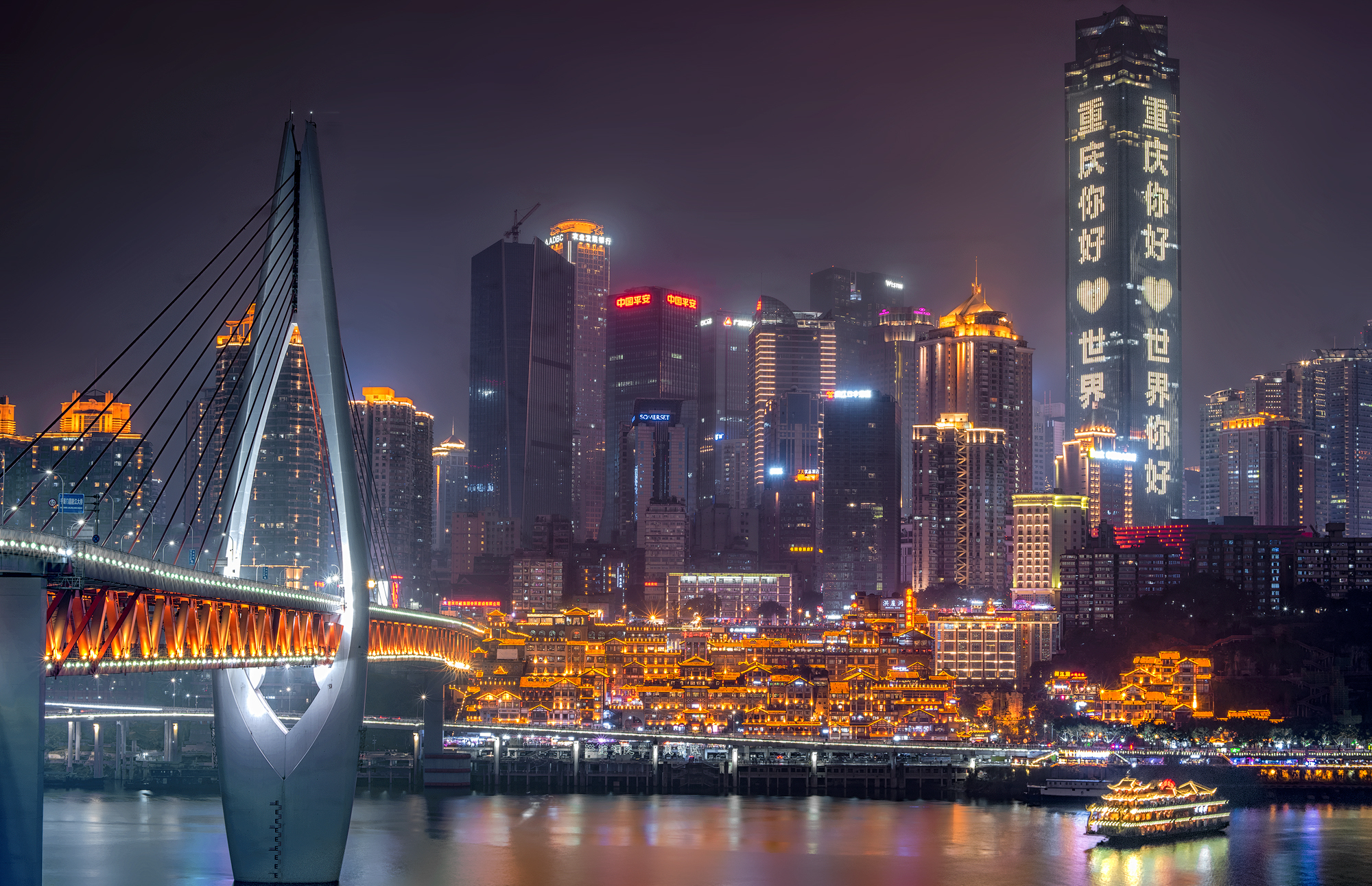
Nightscape in Chongqing, China. Artificial landscapes and "city lights at night" were some of the first metaphors used by the genre for cyberspace (in Neuromancer by William Gibson).

Cyberspace is an interconnected digital environment. It is a type of virtual world popularized with the rise of the Internet. The term entered popular culture from science fiction and the arts but is now used by technology strategists, security professionals, governments, military and industry leaders and entrepreneurs to describe the domain of the global technology environment, commonly defined as standing for the global network of interdependent information technology infrastructures, telecommunications networks and computer processing systems. Others consider cyberspace to be just a notional environment in which communication over computer networks occurs. The word became popular in the 1990s when the use of the Internet, networking, and digital communication were all growing dramatically; the term cyberspace was able to represent the many new ideas and phenomena that were emerging. As a social experience, individuals can interact, exchange ideas, share information, provide social support, conduct business, direct actions, create artistic media, play games, engage in political discussion, and so on, using this global network. Cyberspace users are sometimes referred to as "cybernauts".

The term cyberspace has become a conventional means to describe anything associated with general computing, the Internet and the diverse Internet culture. The U.S. government recognizes the interdependent network of information technology infrastructures and cyber-physical systems operating across this medium as part of the US national critical infrastructure. Amongst individuals on cyberspace, there is believed to be a code of shared rules and ethics mutually beneficial for all to follow, referred to as cyberethics. Many view the right to privacy as most important to a functional code of cyberethics. Such moral responsibilities go hand in hand when working online with global networks, specifically when opinions are involved with online social experiences.

According to Chip Morningstar and F. Randall Farmer, cyberspace is defined more by the social interactions involved rather than its technical implementation. In their view, the computational medium in cyberspace is an augmentation of the communication channel between real people; the core characteristic of cyberspace is that it offers an environment that consists of many participants with the ability to affect and influence each other. They derive this concept from the observation that people seek richness, complexity, and depth within a virtual world.

== Etymology ==
The term cyberspace first appeared in the visual arts in the late 1960s, when Danish artist Susanne Ussing (1940–1998) and her partner architect Carsten Hoff (b. 1934) constituted themselves as Atelier Cyberspace. Under this name the two made a series of installations and images entitled "sensory spaces" that were based on the principle of open systems adaptable to various influences, such as human movement and envisioned urban planning architectures.

Atelier Cyberspace worked at a time when the Internet did not exist and computers were more or less off-limit to artists and creative engagement. In a 2015 interview with Scandinavian art magazine Kunstkritikk, Carsten Hoff recollects that although Atelier Cyberspace did try to implement computers, they had no interest in the virtual space as such:

To us, "cyberspace" was simply about managing spaces. There was nothing esoteric about it. Nothing digital, either. It was just a tool. The space was concrete, physical.

In the same interview, Hoff continues:

Our shared point of departure was that we were working with physical settings, and we were both frustrated and displeased with the architecture from the period, particularly when it came to spaces for living. We felt that there was a need to loosen up the rigid confines of urban planning, giving back the gift of creativity to individual human beings and allowing them to shape and design their houses or dwellings themselves – instead of having some clever architect pop up, telling you how you should live. We were thinking in terms of open-ended systems where things could grow and evolve as required. For instance, we imagined a kind of mobile production unit, but unfortunately the drawings have been lost. It was a kind of truck with a nozzle at the back. Like a bee building its hive. The nozzle would emit and apply material that grew to form amorphous mushrooms or whatever you might imagine. It was supposed to be computer-controlled, allowing you to create interesting shapes and sequences of spaces. It was a merging of organic and technological systems, a new way of structuring the world. And a response that counteracted industrial uniformity. We had this idea that sophisticated software might enable us to mimic the way in which nature creates products – where things that belong to the same family can take different forms. All oak trees are oak trees, but no two oak trees are exactly alike. And then a whole new material – polystyrene foam – arrived on the scene. It behaved like nature in the sense that it grew when its two component parts were mixed. Almost like a fungal growth. This made it an obvious choice for our work in Atelier Cyberspace.

The works of Atelier Cyberspace were originally shown at a number of Copenhagen venues and have later been exhibited at The National Gallery of Denmark in Copenhagen as part of the exhibition "What's Happening?"

The term cyberspace first appeared in fiction in the 1980s in the work of cyberpunk science fiction author William Gibson, first in his 1982 short story "Burning Chrome" and later in his 1984 novel Neuromancer. In the next few years, the word became prominently identified with online computer networks. The portion of Neuromancer cited in this respect is usually the following:

Cyberspace. A consensual hallucination experienced daily by billions of legitimate operators, in every nation, by children being taught mathematical concepts... A graphic representation of data abstracted from the banks of every computer in the human system. Unthinkable complexity. Lines of light ranged in the nonspace of the mind, clusters and constellations of data. Like city lights, receding.

Now widely used, the term has since been criticized by Gibson, who commented on the origin of the term in the 2000 documentary No Maps for These Territories:

All I knew about the word "cyberspace" when I coined it, was that it seemed like an effective buzzword. It seemed evocative and essentially meaningless. It was suggestive of something, but had no real semantic meaning, even for me, as I saw it emerge on the page.

=== Metaphorical ===
Don Slater uses a metaphor to define cyberspace, describing the "sense of a social setting that exists purely within a space of representation and communication ... it exists entirely within a computer space, distributed across increasingly complex and fluid networks." The term cyberspace started to become a de facto synonym for the Internet, and later the World Wide Web, during the 1990s, especially in academic circles and activist communities. Author Bruce Sterling, who popularized this meaning, credits John Perry Barlow as the first to use it to refer to "the present-day nexus of computer and telecommunications networks". Barlow describes it thus in his essay to announce the formation of the Electronic Frontier Foundation (note the spatial metaphor) in June 1990:

In this silent world, all conversation is typed. To enter it, one forsakes both body and place and becomes a thing of words alone. You can see what your neighbors are saying (or recently said), but not what either they or their physical surroundings look like. Town meetings are continuous and discussions rage on everything from sexual kinks to depreciation schedules. Whether by one telephonic tendril or millions, they are all connected to one another. Collectively, they form what their inhabitants call the Net. It extends across that immense region of electron states, microwaves, magnetic fields, light pulses and thought which sci-fi writer William Gibson named Cyberspace.

— John Perry Barlow, "Crime and Puzzlement", 1990-06-08

As Barlow and the EFF continued public education efforts to promote the idea of "digital rights", the term was increasingly used during the Internet boom of the late 1990s.

=== Virtual environments ===
Although in the present-day, loose use of the term cyberspace no longer implies or suggests immersion in a virtual reality, current technology allows the integration of a number of capabilities (sensors, signals, connections, transmissions, processors, and controllers) sufficient to generate a virtual interactive experience that is accessible regardless of a geographic location. It is for these reasons cyberspace has been described as the ultimate tax haven.

In 1989, Autodesk, an American multinational corporation that focuses on 2D and 3D design software, developed a virtual design system called Cyberspace.

=== Recent definitions of Cyberspace ===
Although several definitions of cyberspace can be found both in scientific literature and in official governmental sources, there is no fully agreed official definition yet. According to F. D. Kramer, there are 28 different definitions of the term cyberspace.

The most recent draft definition is the following:

Cyberspace is a global and dynamic domain (subject to constant change) characterized by the combined use of electrons and the electromagnetic spectrum, whose purpose is to create, store, modify, exchange, share, and extract, use, eliminate information and disrupt physical resources. Cyberspace includes: a) physical infrastructures and telecommunications devices that allow for the connection of technological and communication system networks, understood in the broadest sense (SCADA devices, smartphones/tablets, computers, servers, etc.); b) computer systems (see point a) and the related (sometimes embedded) software that guarantee the domain's basic operational functioning and connectivity; c) networks between computer systems; d) networks of networks that connect computer systems (the distinction between networks and networks of networks is mainly organizational); e) the access nodes of users and intermediaries routing nodes; f) constituent data (or resident data). Often, in common parlance (and sometimes in commercial language), networks of networks are called the Internet (with a lowercase i), while networks between computers are called intranet. Internet (with a capital I, in journalistic language sometimes called the Net) can be considered a part of the system a). A distinctive and constitutive feature of cyberspace is that no central entity exercises control over all the networks that make up this new domain. Just as in the real world there is no world government, cyberspace lacks an institutionally predefined hierarchical center. To cyberspace, a domain without a hierarchical ordering principle, we can, therefore, extend the definition of international politics coined by Kenneth Waltz: as being "with no system of law enforceable." This does not mean that the dimension of power in cyberspace is absent, nor that power is dispersed and scattered into a thousand invisible streams, nor that it is evenly spread across myriad people and organizations, as some scholars had predicted. On the contrary, cyberspace is characterized by a precise structuring of hierarchies of power.

The Joint Chiefs of Staff of the United States Department of Defense define cyberspace as one of five interdependent domains, the remaining four being land, air, maritime, and space. See United States Cyber Command

== Cyberspace as an Internet metaphor ==
While cyberspace should not be confused with the Internet, the term is often used to refer to objects and identities that exist largely within the communication network itself, so that a website, for example, might be metaphorically said to "exist in cyberspace". According to this interpretation, events taking place on the Internet are not happening in the locations where participants or servers are physically located, but "in cyberspace". The philosopher Michel Foucault used the term heterotopias to describe such spaces which are simultaneously physical and mental.

Firstly, cyberspace describes the flow of digital data through the network of interconnected computers: it is at once not "real"—since one could not spatially locate it as a tangible object—and clearly "real" in its effects. There have been several attempts to create a concise model about how cyberspace works since it is not a physical thing that can be looked at. Secondly, cyberspace is the site of computer-mediated communication (CMC), in which online relationships and alternative forms of online identity are enacted, raising important questions about the social psychology of Internet use, the relationship between "online" and "offline" forms of life and interaction, and the relationship between the "real" and the virtual. Cyberspace draws attention to the remediation of culture through new media technologies: it is not just a communication tool, but a social destination, and is culturally significant in its own right. Finally, cyberspace can be seen as providing new opportunities to reshape society and culture through "hidden" identities, or it can be seen as borderless communication and culture.

Cyberspace is the "place" where a telephone conversation appears to occur. Not inside your actual phone, the plastic device on your desk. Not inside the other person's phone, in some other city. The place between the phones. [...] in the past twenty years, this electrical "space," which was once thin and dark and one-dimensional—little more than a narrow speaking-tube, stretching from phone to phone—has flung itself open like a gigantic jack-in-the-box. Light has flooded upon it, the eerie light of the glowing computer screen. This dark electric netherworld has become a vast flowering electronic landscape. Since the 1960s, the world of the telephone has cross-bred itself with computers and television, and though there is still no substance to cyberspace, nothing you can handle, it has a strange kind of physicality now. It makes good sense today to talk of cyberspace as a place all its own.

— Bruce Sterling, Introduction to The Hacker Crackdown

The "space" in cyberspace has more in common with the abstract, mathematical meanings of the term (see space) than physical space. It does not have the duality of positive and negative volume (while in physical space, for example, a room has the negative volume of usable space delineated by positive volume of walls, Internet users cannot enter the screen and explore the unknown part of the Internet as an extension of the space they are in), but spatial meaning can be attributed to the relationship between different pages (of books as well as web servers), considering the unturned pages to be somewhere "out there." The concept of cyberspace, therefore, refers not to the content being presented to the surfer, but rather to the possibility of surfing among different sites, with feedback loops between the user and the rest of the system creating the potential to always encounter something unknown or unexpected.

Video games differ from text-based communication in that on-screen images are meant to be figures that actually occupy a space and the animation shows the movement of those figures. Images are supposed to form the positive volume that delineates the empty space. A game adopts the cyberspace metaphor by engaging more players in the game, and then figuratively representing them on the screen as avatars. Games do not have to stop at the avatar-player level, but current implementations aiming for more immersive playing space (i.e. Laser tag) take the form of augmented reality rather than cyberspace, fully immersive virtual realities remaining impractical.

Although the more radical consequences of the global communication network predicted by some cyberspace proponents (i.e. the diminishing of state influence envisioned by John Perry Barlow) failed to materialize and the word lost some of its novelty appeal, it remains current as of 2006.

Some virtual communities explicitly refer to the concept of cyberspace—for example, Linden Lab calling their customers "Residents" of Second Life—while all such communities can be positioned "in cyberspace" for explanatory and comparative purposes (as did Sterling in The Hacker Crackdown, followed by many journalists), integrating the metaphor into a wider cyber-culture.

The metaphor has been useful in helping a new generation of thought leaders to reason through new military strategies around the world, led largely by the US Department of Defense (DoD). The use of cyberspace as a metaphor has had its limits, however, especially in areas where the metaphor becomes confused with physical infrastructure. It has also been critiqued as being unhelpful for falsely employing a spatial metaphor to describe what is inherently a network.

== Alternate realities in philosophy and art ==
=== Predating computers ===
A forerunner of the modern ideas of cyberspace is the Cartesian notion that people might be deceived by an evil demon that feeds them a false reality. This argument is the direct predecessor of modern ideas of a brain in a vat and many popular conceptions of cyberspace take Descartes's ideas as their starting point.

Visual arts have a tradition, stretching back to antiquity, of artifacts meant to fool the eye and be mistaken for reality. This questioning of reality occasionally led some philosophers and especially theologians to distrust art as deceiving people into entering a world which was not real (see Aniconism). The artistic challenge was resurrected with increasing ambition as art became more and more realistic with the invention of photography, film (see Arrival of a Train at La Ciotat), and immersive computer simulations.

=== Influenced by computers ===
==== Philosophy ====
American counterculture exponents like William S. Burroughs (whose literary influence on Gibson and cyberpunk in general is widely acknowledged) and Timothy Leary were among the first to extol the potential of computers and computer networks for individual empowerment.

Some contemporary philosophers and scientists (e.g. David Deutsch in The Fabric of Reality) employ virtual reality in various thought experiments. For example, Philip Zhai in Get Real: A Philosophical Adventure in Virtual Reality connects cyberspace to the Platonic tradition:

Let us imagine a nation in which everyone is hooked up to a network of VR infrastructure. They have been so hooked up since they left their mother's wombs. Immersed in cyberspace and maintaining their life by teleoperation, they have never imagined that life could be any different from that. The first person that thinks of the possibility of an alternative world like ours would be ridiculed by the majority of these citizens, just like the few enlightened ones in Plato's allegory of the cave.

Note that this brain-in-a-vat argument conflates cyberspace with reality, while the more common descriptions of cyberspace contrast it with the "real world".

=== Cyber-geography ===
The "Geography of Notopia" (Papadimitriou, 2006) theorizes about the complex interplay of cyber-cultures and the geographical space. This interplay has several philosophical and psychological facets (Papadimitriou, 2009).

==== A new communication model ====
The technological convergence of the mass media is the result of a long adaptation process of their communicative resources to the evolutionary changes of each historical moment. Thus, the new media became an extension of the traditional media in cyberspace, allowing the public access to information in a wide range of digital devices. In other words, it is a cultural virtualization of human reality as a result of the migration from physical to virtual space (mediated by the ICTs), ruled by codes, signs and particular social relationships. Forwards, arise instant ways of communication, interaction and possible quick access to information, in which we are no longer mere senders, but also producers, reproducers, co-workers and providers. New technologies also help to "connect" people from different cultures outside the virtual space, which was unthinkable fifty years ago. In this giant relationships web, we mutually absorb each other's beliefs, customs, values, laws and habits, cultural legacies perpetuated by a physical-virtual dynamics in constant metamorphosis (ibidem). In this sense, Professor Doctor Marcelo Mendonça Teixeira created, in 2013, a new model of communication to the virtual universe, based in Claude Elwood Shannon (1948) article "A Mathematical Theory of Communication".

==== Art ====
Having originated among writers, the concept of cyberspace remains most popular in literature and film. Although artists working with other media have expressed interest in the concept, such as Roy Ascott, "cyberspace" in digital art is mostly used as a synonym for immersive virtual reality and remains more discussed than enacted.

==== Computer crime ====
Cyberspace also brings together every service and facility imaginable to expedite money laundering. One can purchase anonymous credit cards, bank accounts, encrypted global mobile telephones, and false passports. From there one can pay professional advisors to set up IBCs (International Business Corporations, or corporations with anonymous ownership) or similar structures in OFCs (Offshore Financial Centers). Such advisors are loath to ask any penetrating questions about the wealth and activities of their clients, since the average fees criminals pay them to launder their money can be as much as 20 percent.

==== 5-level model ====
In 2010, a five-level model was designed in France. According to this model, cyberspace is composed of five layers based on information discoveries: 1) language, 2) writing, 3) printing, 4) Internet, 5) Etc., i.e. the rest, e.g. noosphere, artificial life, artificial intelligence, etc., etc. This original model links the world of information to telecommunication technologies.

== See also ==
- Cyber-HUMINT – Set of skills used by cyberspace hackers
- Information superhighway – Term used in the 1990s to refer to the Internet
- Internet of things – Internet-like structure connecting everyday physical objects
- Metaverse – Collective three-dimensional virtual shared space
- Simulated reality – Concept of a false version of reality
- Telepresence – Technologies allowing a person to feel they are present in another place
- Virtual world – Large-scale, interactive computer-simulated environment
