= Information Harvesting =

Information Harvesting (IH) was an early data mining product from the 1990s. It was invented by Ralphe Wiggins and produced by the Ryan Corp, later Information Harvesting Inc., of Cambridge, Massachusetts. Wiggins had a background in genetic algorithms and fuzzy logic. IH sought to infer rules from sets of data. It did this first by classifying various input variables into one of a number of bins, thereby putting some structure on the continuous variables in the input. IH then proceeds to generate rules, trading off generalization against memorization, that will infer the value of the prediction variable, possibly creating many levels of rules in the process. It included strategies for checking if overfitting took place and, if so, correcting for it. Because of its strategies for correcting for overfitting by considering more data, and refining the rules based on that data, IH might also be considered to be a form of machine learning.

The advantage of IH, as compared with other data mining products of its time and even later, was that it provided a mechanism for finding multiple rules that would classify the data and determining, according to set criteria, the best rules to use.
