= Trần Quang Hiếu =

Vietnamese artist

- Born: 1938
- Died: 1985 (aged 46–47)
- Occupation: Artist

Trần Quang Hiếu (1938–1985) was a Vietnamese artist. He studied in France and in the 1960s was seen as one of the younger artists continuing the traditions of the École des Beaux-Arts de l'Indochine (1925–1945).
