= Salt Typhoon =

Advanced persistent threat operated by the Chinese government

- Formation: c. 2020; 6 years ago
- Type: Advanced persistent threat
- Location: China
- Parent organization: Ministry of State Security
- Affiliations: Sichuan Juxinhe Network Technology Co. Ltd. Beijing Huanyu Tianqiong Information Technology Co., Ltd. Sichuan Zhixin Ruijie Network Technology Co., Ltd.

Salt Typhoon is an advanced persistent threat actor believed to be operated by China's Ministry of State Security (MSS) which has conducted high-profile cyber espionage campaigns, particularly against the United States. The group's operations place an emphasis on counterintelligence targets in the United States and data theft of key corporate intellectual property. The group has infiltrated over 200 targets in over 80 countries. Former NSA analyst Terry Dunlap has described the group as a "component of China's 100 year strategy."

== Organization and attribution ==
Salt Typhoon is widely understood to be operated by China's Ministry of State Security (MSS), its foreign intelligence service and secret police. The Chinese embassy in New Zealand denied all allegations, saying it was "unfounded and irresponsible smears and slanders".

According to Trend Micro, the group is a "well-organized group with a clear division of labor" whereby attacks targeting different regions and industries are launched by distinct actors, suggesting the group consists of various teams, "further highlighting the complexity of the group's operations." The cyberattacks were reported to have commenced since at least 2023.

== History ==
=== 2023 to 2024: Telecommunication Hacks ===
In September 2024, reports first emerged that a severe cyberattack had compromised U.S. telecommunications systems. US officials stated that the campaign was likely underway for one to two years prior to its discovery, with several dozen countries compromised in the hack, including those in Europe and the Indo-Pacific. The campaign was reportedly "intended as a Chinese espionage program focused on key government officials [and] key corporate [intellectual property]."

In late 2024 U.S. officials announced that hackers affiliated with Salt Typhoon had accessed the computer systems of nine U.S. telecommunications companies, later acknowledged to include Verizon, AT&T, T-Mobile, Spectrum, Lumen, Consolidated Communications, and Windstream. The attack targeted U.S. broadband networks, particularly core network components, including routers manufactured by Cisco, which route large portions of the Internet. In October 2024, U.S. officials revealed that the group had compromised internet service provider (ISP) systems used to fulfill CALEA requests used by U.S. law enforcement and intelligence agencies to conduct court-authorized wiretapping.

The hackers were able to access metadata of users' calls and text messages, including date and time stamps, source and destination IP addresses, and phone numbers from over a million users; most of which were located in the Washington D.C. metro area. In some cases, the hackers were able to obtain audio recordings of telephone calls made by high-profile individuals. Such individuals reportedly included staff of the Kamala Harris 2024 presidential campaign, as well as phones belonging to Donald Trump and JD Vance. According to deputy national security advisor Anne Neuberger, a "large number" of the individuals whose data was directly accessed were "government targets of interest."

In March 2025, the United States House Committee on Homeland Security requested that the Department of Homeland Security (DHS) turn over documents on the federal government's response to the hacking.

The second Trump administration fired all members of the Cyber Safety Review Board before it could complete its investigation of the intrusion. In April 2025, the Federal Bureau of Investigation (FBI) announced a US$10 million bounty for information on individuals associated with Salt Typhoon.

In December 2024, Verizon and AT&T announced that they had contained the incident and that the threat actor no longer had access to their networks. On June 12, 2025, Senator Maria Cantwell, the Ranking Member of the Senate Committee on Commerce, Science and Transportation, wrote letters to the CEOs of AT&T and Verizon requesting they provide detailed information regarding the cybersecurity investigations conducted at both companies. Senator Cantwell asked for a list of all vulnerabilities identified that allowed the attackers in, as well as remediation plans and documentation supporting the claim that Salt Typhoon was no longer present in their networks.

8 months later, in February 2026 Senator Cantwell sent a letter to Committee Chairman Ted Cruz requesting he convene a hearing in which the CEOs of AT&T and Verizon would be asked about the current security of their networks. The letter claims that both companies hired Mandiant to conduct security assessments but that Mandiant failed to provide reports generated by these assessments after the reports were requested.

=== 2024 to 2025: National Guard and Congressional committees ===
On June 11, 2025, the DHS published a report entitled Salt Typhoon: Data Theft Likely Signals Expanded Targeting. In the report, the agency describes how the threat actor group compromised the network of an unnamed US state's Army National Guard.

In August 2025, the FBI stated that Salt Typhoon has hacked at least 200 companies across 80 countries. On August 27, 2025, intelligence and cybersecurity agencies from 13 countries, including the United States, the United Kingdom, Australia, Canada and Japan, published a joint advisory attributing an espionage campaign that partially overlaps with Salt Typhoon activity to three Chinese technology firms. According to the advisory, the firms had supplied cyber products and services to units of the People's Liberation Army and the Ministry of State Security since at least 2021, and data taken from the telecommunications, lodging and transportation sectors let Chinese intelligence follow the communications and movements of its targets around the world.

In December 2025, intrusions were detected in several United States House of Representatives committees and later attributed to Salt Typhoon.

=== Australia ===
In November 2025, Australian Security Intelligence Organisation director-general Mike Burgess said hackers linked to the Chinese government and military had attempted to access Australia's critical infrastructure, including telecommunications networks. He identified the groups Salt Typhoon and Volt Typhoon, which also infiltrated U.S. systems for espionage and potential sabotage, and warned that similar probing had occurred in Australia.

== Targets ==
According to The New York Times, Salt Typhoon is unique in focusing primarily on counterintelligence targets. In addition to U.S. Internet service providers, the Slovak cybersecurity firm ESET says Salt Typhoon has previously broken into hotels and government agencies worldwide. An unnamed Canadian telecom company was breached in February 2025. In June 2025, Viasat (a US telecom) was named as a victim of Salt Typhoon.

== Tactics, techniques, and procedures ==
Salt Typhoon reportedly employs a Windows kernel-mode rootkit, Demodex (name given by Kaspersky Lab), to gain remote control over their targeted servers. They demonstrate a high level of sophistication and use anti-forensic and anti-analysis techniques to evade detection.

=== Initial access ===
To gain initial access into their targets, the group has been observed exploiting known vulnerabilities in firewalls, routers, and VPN products:

| CVE | Description |
|---|---|
| CVE-2024-21887 | Ivanti Connect Secure and Ivanti Policy Secure web-component command injection vulnerability |
| CVE-2024-3400 | Palo Alto Networks PAN-OS GlobalProtect arbitrary file creation leading to OS command injection. |
| CVE-2023-20273 | Cisco Internetworking Operating System (IOS) XE software web management user interface post-authentication command injection/privilege escalation |
| CVE-2023-20198 | Cisco IOS XE web user interface authentication bypass |
| CVE-2018-0171 | Cisco IOS and IOS XE smart install remote code execution |
| CVE-2021-26855 | Microsoft Exchange Server Server-Side Request Forgery Vulnerability (ProxyLogon) |
| CVE-2022-3236 | Sophos Firewall Code Injection Vulnerability |
| CVE-2023-48788 | FortiClient Enterprise Management Server (FortiClientEMS) SQL Injection Vulnerability |
| CVE-2023-46805 | Ivanti Connect Secure and Ivanti Policy Secure Authentication Bypass Vulnerability |
| CVE-2025-5777 | Citrix NetScaler Gateway Unauthenticated Memory Read Access |

=== Persistence ===
Salt Typhoon employs many techniques to maintain access to their targets and avoid detection.

- Modifying access-control lists (ACLs) to add IP addresses.
- Exposing services such as SSH, RDP, or FTP to facilitate remote access or data exfiltration. The services are run on both standard and non-standard ports to help evade detection. The group has also been observed adding keys to existing SSH services.
- Creating tunnels over protocols, such as Generic Routing Encapsulation (GRE) or IPsec, on network devices.
- Running commands inside of Linux containers on Cisco networking devices via Guest Shell. This allows the threat actor to stage tools, process data, and move laterally through the network undetected as the activities inside the container are not generally monitored.
- Using open source multi-hop pivoting tools to relay commands from command and control servers

== Affiliations ==
Salt Typhoon is aided by a number of companies that work closely with Chinese intelligence services to provide cyber services, including:

- Sichuan Juxinhe Network Technology Co. Ltd.
- Beijing Huanyu Tianqiong Information Technology Co., Ltd.
- Sichuan Zhixin Ruijie Network Technology Co., Ltd.

On January 17, 2025, the U.S. Department of the Treasury announced sanctions against Sichuan Juxinhe Network Technology Co., LTD. The statement accused Sichuan Juxinhe of having direct involvement with Salt Typhoon and that the group was responsible for breaching multiple U.S. telecommunication and internet service provider companies.

== Name ==
Salt Typhoon is the name assigned by Microsoft and is the one most widely used to describe the group. The group has also variously been called:

- Earth Estrie by Trend Micro
- Ghost Emperor by Kaspersky Lab
- FamousSparrow by ESET
- UNC2286 by Mandiant

== See also ==
- Volt Typhoon
- Cyberwarfare and China
- Chinese information operations and information warfare
- Chinese espionage in the United States
