= National Cyber Security Centre (New Zealand) =

The National Cyber Security Centre in New Zealand is a branch of the Government Communications Security Bureau. They have been assisting the Waikato District Health Board with the May 2021 attack on their IT systems.
