= TinyShell =

TinyShell is a backdoor written in C that has been used by groups such as Limnal Panda and Violet Ant.

TinyShell is open source and runs on Unix. It has been used to connect to command and control servers.
