= Advanced persistent threat =

Set of stealthy and continuous computer hacking processes

An advanced persistent threat (APT) is a stealthy cybersecurity threat, typically manipulated by a state or state-sponsored group, which gains unauthorized access to a computer network and remains undetected for an extended period. In recent times, the term may also refer to non-state-sponsored groups conducting large-scale targeted intrusions for specific goals.

Such threat actors' motivations are typically political or economic. Every major business sector has recorded instances of cyberattacks by advanced actors with specific goals, whether to steal, spy, or disrupt. These targeted sectors include government, defense, financial services, legal services, industrial, telecoms, consumer goods and many more. Some groups utilize traditional espionage vectors, including social engineering, human intelligence and infiltration to gain access to a physical location to enable network attacks. The purpose of these attacks is to install custom malware.

APT attacks on mobile devices have also become a legitimate concern, since attackers are able to penetrate into cloud and mobile infrastructure to eavesdrop, steal, and tamper with data.

The median "dwell-time", the time an APT attack goes undetected, differs widely between regions. FireEye reported the mean dwell-time for 2018 in the Americas as 71 days, EMEA as 177 days, and APAC as 204 days. Such a long dwell-time allows attackers a significant amount of time to go through the attack cycle, propagate, and achieve their objectives.

== Definition ==
Definitions of precisely what an APT is can vary, but can be summarized by their named requirements below:

- Advanced – Operators behind the threat have a full spectrum of intelligence-gathering techniques at their disposal. These may include commercial and open source computer intrusion technologies and techniques, but may also extend to include the intelligence apparatus of a state. While individual components of the attack may not be considered particularly "advanced" (e.g. malware components generated from commonly available do-it-yourself malware construction kits, or the use of easily procured exploit materials), their operators can typically access and develop more advanced tools as required. They often combine multiple targeting methods, tools, and techniques in order to reach and compromise their target and maintain access to it. Operators may also demonstrate a deliberate focus on operational security that differentiates them from "less advanced" threats.
- Persistent – Operators have specific objectives, rather than opportunistically seeking information for financial or other gain. This distinction implies that the attackers are guided by external entities. The targeting is conducted through continuous monitoring and interaction in order to achieve the defined objectives. It does not mean a barrage of constant attacks and malware updates. In fact, a "low-and-slow" approach is usually more successful. If the operator loses access to their target they usually will reattempt access, and most often, successfully. One of the operator's goals is to maintain long-term access to the target, in contrast to threats who only need access to execute a specific task.
- Threat – APTs are a threat because they have both capability and intent. APT attacks are executed by coordinated human actions, rather than by mindless and automated pieces of code. The operators have a specific objective and are skilled, motivated, organized and well funded. Actors are not limited to state sponsored groups.

== History and targets ==
Warnings against targeted, socially-engineered emails dropping trojans to exfiltrate sensitive information were published by UK and US CERT organisations in 2005. This method was used throughout the early 1990s and does not in itself constitute an APT. The term "advanced persistent threat" has been cited as originating from the United States Air Force in 2006 with Colonel Greg Rattray cited as the individual who coined the term.

The Stuxnet computer worm, which targeted the computer hardware of Iran's nuclear program, is one example of an APT attack. In this case, the Iranian government might consider the Stuxnet creators to be an advanced persistent threat.

Within the computer security community, and increasingly within the media, the term is almost always used in reference to a long-term pattern of sophisticated computer network exploitation aimed at governments, companies, and political activists, and by extension, also to ascribe the A, P and T attributes to the groups behind these attacks. Advanced persistent threat (APT) as a term may be shifting focus to computer-based hacking due to the rising number of occurrences. PC World reported an 81 percent increase from 2010 to 2011 of particularly advanced targeted computer attacks.

Actors in many countries have used cyberspace as a means to gather intelligence on individuals and groups of individuals of interest. The United States Cyber Command is tasked with coordinating the US military's offensive and defensive cyber operations.

Numerous sources have alleged that some APT groups are affiliated with, or are agents of, governments of sovereign states. Businesses holding a large quantity of personally identifiable information are at high risk of being targeted by advanced persistent threats, including:

- Agriculture
- Energy
- Financial institutions
- Health care
- Higher education
- Manufacturing
- Technology
- Telecommunications
- Transportation

A Bell Canada study provided deep research into the anatomy of APTs and uncovered widespread presence in Canadian government and critical infrastructure. Attribution was established to Chinese and Russian actors.

== Life cycle ==
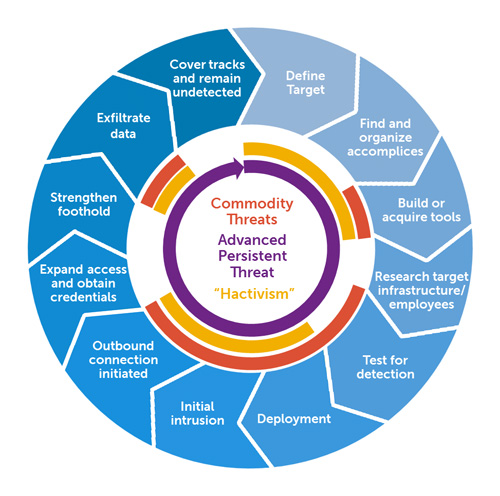
A diagram depicting the life cycle staged approach of an advanced persistent threat (APT), which repeats itself once complete.

Actors behind advanced persistent threats create a growing and changing risk to organizations' financial assets, intellectual property, and reputation by following a continuous process or kill chain:

1. Target specific organizations for a singular objective
2. Attempt to gain a foothold in the environment (common tactics include spear phishing emails)
3. Use the compromised systems as access into the target network
4. Deploy additional tools that help fulfill the attack objective
5. Cover tracks to maintain access for future initiatives

In 2013, Mandiant presented results of their research on alleged Chinese attacks using APT method between 2004 and 2013 that followed similar lifecycle:

- Initial compromise – performed by use of social engineering and spear phishing, over email, using zero-day viruses. Another popular infection method was planting malware on a website that the victim's employees will be likely to visit.
- Establish foothold – plant remote administration software in victim's network, create net backdoors and tunnels allowing stealth access to its infrastructure.
- Escalate privileges – use exploits and password cracking to acquire administrator privileges over victim's computer and possibly expand it to Windows domain administrator accounts.
- Internal reconnaissance – collect information on surrounding infrastructure, trust relationships, Windows domain structure.
- Move laterally – expand control to other workstations, servers and infrastructure elements and perform data harvesting on them.
- Maintain presence – ensure continued control over access channels and credentials acquired in previous steps.
- Complete mission – exfiltrate stolen data from victim's network.

In incidents analysed by Mandiant, the average period over which the attackers controlled the victim's network was one year, with longest – almost five years. The infiltrations were allegedly performed by Shanghai-based Unit 61398 of People's Liberation Army. Chinese officials have denied any involvement in these attacks.

Previous reports from Secdev had previously discovered and implicated Chinese actors.

== Mitigation strategies ==
There are tens of millions of malware variations, which makes it extremely challenging to protect organizations from APT. While APT activities are stealthy and hard to detect, the command and control network traffic associated with APT can be detected at the network layer level with sophisticated methods. Deep log analyses and log correlation from various sources is of limited usefulness in detecting APT activities. It is challenging to separate noises from legitimate traffic. Traditional security technology and methods have been ineffective in detecting or mitigating APTs. Active cyber defense has yielded greater efficacy in detecting and prosecuting APTs (find, fix, finish) when applying cyber threat intelligence to hunt and adversary pursuit activities. Human-Introduced Cyber Vulnerabilities (HICV) are a weak cyber link that are neither well understood nor mitigated, constituting a significant attack vector.

== APT groups ==
The following is a non-exhaustive selection of documented advanced persistent threats:

=== China ===
- PLA Unit 61398 (also known as APT1)
- PLA Unit 61486 (also known as APT2)
- Buckeye (also known as APT3)
- Red Apollo (also known as APT10)
- Numbered Panda (also known as APT12)
- APT15 (also known as Vixen Panda or Ke3chang)
- DeputyDog (also known as APT17)
- Dynamite Panda or Scandium (also known as APT18, a unit of the People's Liberation Army Navy)
- Codoso Team (also known as APT19)
- Wocao (also known as APT20)
- APT22 (aka Suckfly)
- APT26 (aka Turbine Panda)
- APT 27
- PLA Unit 78020 (also known as APT30 and Naikon)
- Zirconium (also known as APT31, Violet Typhoon, or the Wuhan Xiaoruizhi Science and Technology Company)
- APT40
- Double Dragon (also known as APT41, Winnti Group, Barium, or Axiom)
- Spamouflage (also known as Dragonbridge or Storm 1376)
- Hafnium
- LightBasin (Also known as UNC1945)
- Tropic Trooper
- Volt Typhoon
- Flax Typhoon
- Charcoal Typhoon (also known as CHROMIUM)
- Salmon Typhoon (also known as SODIUM)
- Salt Typhoon (also known as GhostEmperor or FamousSparrow)
- Liminal Panda
- MirrorFace
- Mustang Panda (also known as UNC6384)
- UNC3886
- Phantom Taurus
- UNC2814

=== Pakistan ===
- Gorgon Group
- Transparent Tribe (also known as APT36)
- Operation C-Major
- ReverseRat
- SideCopy

=== Iran ===
- Charming Kitten (also known as APT35)
- Elfin Team (also known as APT33)
- Helix Kitten (also known as APT34)
- Pioneer Kitten
- Remix Kitten (also known as APT39, ITG07, or Chafer)
- MuddyWater

=== North Korea ===
- Kimsuky (also known as APT43)
- Lazarus Group (also known as APT38)
- Ricochet Chollima (also known as APT37)

=== Russia ===
- Berserk Bear
- Cozy Bear (also known as APT29)
- Fancy Bear (also known as APT28)
- FIN7
- Gamaredon (also known as Primitive Bear) (Note: active since 2013, unlike most APTs, Gamaredon broadly targets all users all over the globe (in addition to also focusing on certain victims, especially Ukrainian organizations) and appears to provide services for other APTs. For example, the InvisiMole threat group has attacked select systems that Gamaredon had earlier compromised and fingerprinted.)
- Sandworm (also known as APT44)
- Venomous Bear

=== Turkey ===
- StrongPity (also known as APT-C-41 or PROMETHIUM)
- Sea Turtle (also known as Marbled Dust, Teal Kurma, SILICON, Cosmic Wolf, or UNC1326)

=== United States ===
- Equation Group
- Evaluation Group

=== Uzbekistan ===
- SandCat, associated with the State Security Service according to Kaspersky

=== Vietnam ===
- OceanLotus (also known as APT32)

=== India ===
- APT-C-35
- Appin
- Bahamut
- Confucius
- Hangover Group
- ModifiedElephant
- Patchwork (Dark Samurai)
- SideWinder
- Scybers
- Urpage

== Naming ==
Multiple organizations may assign different names to the same actor. As separate researchers could each have their own varying assessments of an APT group, companies such as CrowdStrike, Kaspersky, Mandiant, and Microsoft, among others, have their own internal naming schemes. Names between different organizations may refer to overlapping but ultimately different groups, based on various data gathered.

CrowdStrike assigns animals by nation-state or other category, such as "Kitten" for Iran and "Spider" for groups focused on cybercrime. Other companies have named groups based on this system — Rampant Kitten, for instance, was named by Check Point rather than CrowdStrike.

Dragos bases its names for APT groups on minerals.

Mandiant assigns numbered acronyms in three categories, APT, FIN, and UNC, resulting in APT names like FIN7. Other companies using a similar system include Proofpoint (TA) and IBM (ITG and Hive).

Microsoft used to assign names from the periodic table, often stylized in all-caps (e.g. POTASSIUM); in April 2023, Microsoft changed its naming schema to use weather-based names (e.g. Volt Typhoon).

== See also ==
- Bureau 121
- Chinese intelligence activity abroad
- Cyber spying
- Darkhotel
- Fileless malware
- Ghostnet
- Kill chain
- NetSpectre
- Operation Aurora
- Operation Shady RAT
- Proactive cyber defence
- Spear-phishing
- Spyware
- Stuxnet
- Tailored Access Operations
- Unit 180
- Unit 8200
