= Dmitri Alperovitch =

American security analyst

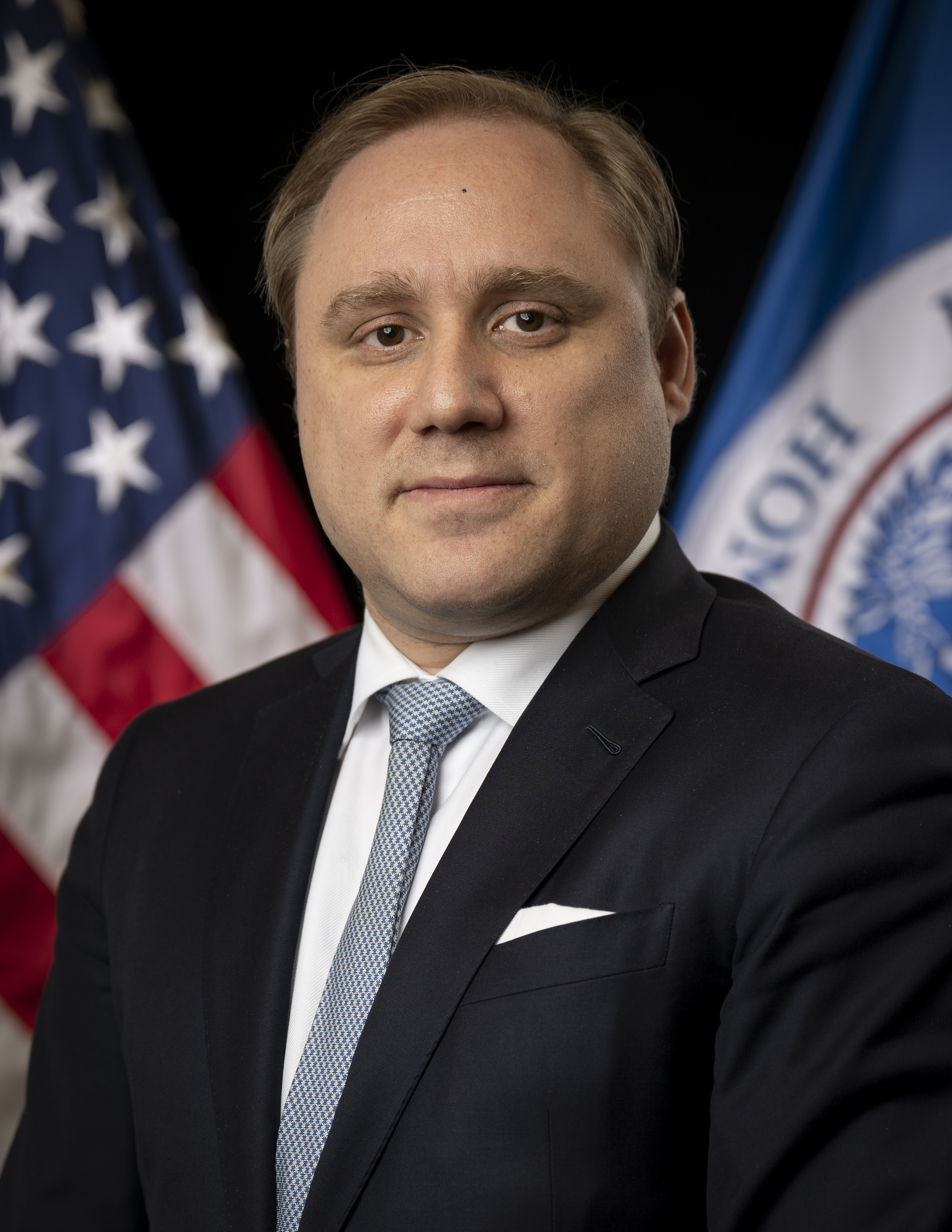
- Official portrait, 2022
- Born: 1980 (age 45–46); Moscow, Russian SFSR, Soviet Union
- Citizenship: United States
- Education: Georgia Institute of Technology (BS, MS)
- Occupations: Co-founder and chairman of Silverado Policy Accelerator
- Employer: Silverado Policy Accelerator
- Known for: Predicting Russian full-scale invasion of Ukraine; Democratic National Committee cyber attacks; Operation Aurora; Operation Shady RAT
- Awards: Fortune 40 Under 40 (2017); Politico 50 (2016); TR35 (2013); FP Top 100 Global Thinkers (2013)

Dmitri Alperovitch (Russian: Дмитрий Альперович; born 1980) is an American think-tank founder, author, philanthropist, podcast host and former computer security industry executive. He is the chairman of Silverado Policy Accelerator, a geopolitics think-tank in Washington, D.C., and a co-founder and former chief technology officer of CrowdStrike. Alperovitch is a naturalized U.S. citizen born in Russia who immigrated from the country in 1994 with his family.

== Early life and education ==
Born in Moscow in the Russian SFSR, a constituent republic of the Soviet Union, Alperovitch left Russia at the age of 13 in 1994. In 1994, his father was granted a visa to Canada, and a year later the family moved to Chattanooga, Tennessee, where his father got a job at the Tennessee Valley Authority (TVA) corporation. When still in high school, he and his father Michael, a nuclear physicist, started an encryption-technology business. Alperovitch earned a BS in computer science in 2001, and a MS in information security in 2003, both from Georgia Institute of Technology. It was the school's first graduate degree in information security. Alperovitch is a U.S. citizen.

== Career ==
Alperovitch worked at a number of computer security startups in the late 1990s and early 2000s, including e-mail security startup CipherTrust, where he was one of the leading inventors of the TrustedSource reputation system. Upon acquisition of CipherTrust by Secure Computing in 2006, he led the research team and launched the Software-as-a-Service business for the company. Alperovitch took over as vice president of threat research at McAfee, when the company acquired Secure Computing in 2008.

In January 2010, he led the investigation into Operation Aurora, the Chinese intrusions into Google and two dozen other companies. Subsequently, he led the investigation of Night Dragon espionage operation of the Western multinational oil and gas companies, and traced them to Song Zhiyue, a Chinese national living in Heze City, Shandong.

In August 2011, he published Operation Shady RAT, a report on suspected Chinese intrusions into at least 72 organizations, including defense contractors, businesses worldwide, the United Nations and the International Olympic Committee.

=== CrowdStrike ===
In late 2011, along with entrepreneur George Kurtz and Gregg Marston, Dmitri Alperovitch co-founded and became the chief technology officer of CrowdStrike, a security technology company focused on helping enterprises and governments protect their intellectual property and secrets against cyber espionage and cybercrime.

In 2015, CapitalG (formerly Google Capital), led a $100 million capital drive for CrowdStrike. The firm brought on board senior FBI executives, such as Shawn Henry, former executive assistant director (EAD) of the FBI's Criminal, Cyber, Response and Services Branch, and Steve Chabinsky, former deputy assistant director of the FBI's Cyber Division. By May 2017, CrowdStrike had received $256 million in funding from Warburg Pincus, Accel Partners, and Google Capital and its stock was valued at just under $1 billion.

In June 2019, the company made an initial public offering (IPO) on the NASDAQ, which valued the company at over $10 billion.

=== Silverado Policy Accelerator ===
In February 2020, Alperovitch left CrowdStrike to launch the Silverado Policy Accelerator, a nonprofit focused on solving policy challenges connected to great power competition between the U.S. and its adversaries. The organization focuses in particular on policy issues related to military strategy, cybersecurity, international trade and industrial security, and economic and energy security. Silverado Policy Accelerator launched in March 2021 with Alperovitch as its executive chairman.

In December 2021, Alperovitch correctly predicted the 2022 Russian invasion of Ukraine, which began in February 2022. Alperovitch, who is a strong critic of Russia's leader Vladimir Putin, said: "For Putin, it's really not about whether he can capture a village and keep it occupied. His determination from day one has been to control Ukraine, to prevent Ukraine from being part of the Western alliance."

On November 11, 2022, he was personally sanctioned by the Ministry of Foreign Affairs (Russia) and banned from entry to Russia, along with David Petraeus, James Stavridis and Ian Bremmer.

In December 2024, along with Cold War historian Sergey Radchenko, Alperovitch proposed that the incoming Trump administration try to pry North Korea away from the emerging Russia-China-Iran axis and attempt to negotiate a peace deal that does not demand full denuclearization but instead prioritizes nonproliferation, moratorium on nuclear tests, end to provocative missile launches and termination of cyber attacks against the West.

In January 2025, Alperovitch predicted that Israel would likely bomb Iran later that year, which did occur in June 2025.

On Sunday February 22, 2026, he predicted that the US would launch a war against Iran sometime that week. The attacks began on Saturday February 28.

=== U.S. Government ===
Alperovitch was an inaugural member of the Cyber Safety Review Board. In January 2025, the Department of Homeland Security dismissed all members of its advisory boards, including the Cyber Safety Review Board.

In 2023, he was the Deputy Chair of the Cyber Safety Review Board's review of Microsoft Exchange Online intrusion by Storm-0558, a Chinese government-affiliated group of hackers. The review discovered that Storm-0558 broke into Microsoft's corporate network and stole a cryptographic key used for signing authentication tokens for accessing customer email accounts. It then used that key to forge tokens to access Microsoft Exchange Online mailboxes of 22 organizations and over 500 individuals around the world, including the email accounts of then Commerce Secretary Gina Raimondo, United States Ambassador to China R. Nicholas Burns, and Congressman Don Bacon.

In March 2022, he was appointed a member of Homeland Security Advisory Council.

Alperovitch has also served as a Special Advisor to the Department of Defense.

=== Board memberships ===
Alperovitch is the chairman of the board of directors of Automox, a cloud-based IT operations company, a board member of Dragos, a company that provides cybersecurity solutions for industrial controls systems, and a board observer for Sublime Security, an email security company.

== Philanthropy ==
In October 2021, Alperovitch announced the launch of the Alperovitch Institute for Cybersecurity Studies to be based at the Johns Hopkins University's Paul H. Nitze School of Advanced International Studies. The institute will offer Master of Arts and doctor of philosophy degrees in cybersecurity studies and policy, and an Executive Education program for private sector and government leaders.

== Podcasting and public speaking ==
Following the Russian invasion of Ukraine in 2022, Alperovitch became the host of Geopolitics Decanted podcast, where he discusses current geopolitical events with military experts, historians, economists and political scientists. Dmitri is also an occasional guest on the Risky Business IT Security podcast to provide his insights into the field and geopolitics.

Alperovitch spoke at the WORLD.MINDS meeting in June 2025 in Washington DC about China, AI and the transatlantic relationship.

== Books ==
=== World on the Brink ===
Alperovitch is an author, along with Garrett Graff, of the book: World on the Brink: How America Can Beat China in the Race for the Twenty-First Century.

The book was released in the United States on April 30, 2024. It "offers practical advice about how America can win against China" and lays out the case for why China's Xi Jinping is preparing to conquer Taiwan in the coming years and the dire stakes for America and the whole world if he is not deterred.

The book argues that the world is already in the midst of Cold War II between the US and China, and that Taiwan is the perilous strategic flashpoint that risks triggering a devastating war between major nuclear powers in a similar role that West Berlin nearly played during Cold War I. It offers a comprehensive strategy for the US to deter war and maintain its place as the world's leading superpower in the face of rising China.

== Awards ==
Alperovitch was awarded the Outstanding American by Choice Award by the United States Citizenship and Immigration Services in 2023 and the Federal 100 Award for his contributions to the U.S. federal information security and was recognized in 2013 and 2015 as one of Washingtonian's Tech Titans for his accomplishments in the field of cybersecurity.

In August 2013, he was selected as one of MIT Technology Review's Top 35 Innovators Under 35.

In 2016, Politico magazine featured him as one of "Politico 50" influential thinkers, doers, and visionaries transforming U.S. politics.

In 2017, Fortune magazine listed Alperovitch in "40 Under 40" annual ranking of the most influential young people in business.

He was named in December 2013 as one of Foreign Policy's Top 100 Leading Global Thinkers.
