= Secure computing =

Secure computing may refer to:

- Secure Computing (Company), a public computer security company acquired by McAfee.
- Computer security, information security as applied to computers and networks.
