= People's Liberation Army Aerospace Force =

Space warfare arm of the People's Liberation Army

- 中国人民解放军军事航天部队
- Founded: 19 April 2024; 2 years ago
- Country: China
- Allegiance: Chinese Communist Party
- Type: Space force
- Role: Space warfare
- Size: 40,000 personnel
- Part of: People's Liberation Army

Commanders
- Commander: Lieutenant General Hao Weizhong
- Political Commissar: Vacant

Insignia
- Symbol

- Flag

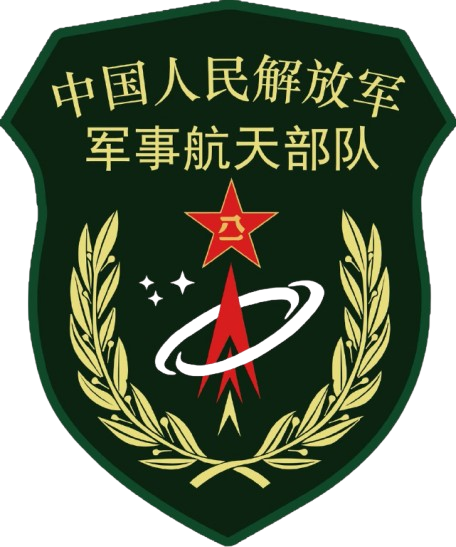
- Sleeve Badge

The People's Liberation Army Aerospace Force (PLAASF, Chinese: 中国人民解放军军事航天部队, romanized: Zhōngguó rénmín jiěfàngjūn jūnshì hángtiān bùduì) is the space service branch of the People's Liberation Army (PLA), the military forces of China. Established on 19 April 2024, it is one of two independent space forces in the world, along with the United States Space Force.

The PLAASF operates China's four spaceports: Jiuquan, Taiyuan, Wenchang, and Xichang, which launch all civilian and military payloads as well as China's crewed flights. Satellites are communicated with via ground centers in Beijing, Jiangyin, and Xi'an. The force commands China's Astronaut Corps and operates its Astronaut Center.

The PLAASF operates China's military satellites, an estimated 245 as of 2024. These include 115 reconnaissance satellites, 81 signals intelligence satellites, 45 for the BeiDou system of satellite navigation, 12 military communications satellites, and three early warning satellites for ballistic missile launches. China also operates the reusable experimental spacecraft which is a robotic spaceplane. China conducted one destructive anti-satellite weapon test in 2007, using an SC-19 missile.

The force operates Lop Nur Nuclear Test Base, the only nuclear test site of China's nuclear weapons program, and other research centers including for aerodynamics in Mianyang, for metrology and astronomy in Luoyang, and for telemetry in Beijing.

In 2024, the People's Liberation Army Strategic Support Force was separated into the Aerospace Force, as well as the Cyberspace Force and Information Support Force.

== History ==
The PLA Aerospace Force was established on 19 April 2024, taking control of aerospace units and assets from the simultaneously disestablished Strategic Support Force. The PLAASF consolidates all the PLA's space-based C4ISR systems, as well as administering all the existing launch sites, and all other military satellites and space assets.

The China Daily referred to it as the People's Liberation Army Space Force before its official English name was released.

== Organization ==
The PLAASF is headquartered in the Haidian District of Beijing.

Central staff sections include:

- Staff department (参谋部)
  - Information and Communications Division (信息通信处)
- Political Work Department (政治工作部)
  - Cadre Bureau(干部局)
  - Innovation Office(创作室)
- Logistics Department (后勤部)
  - Engineering Construction Management Office 工程代建管理办公室(创作室)
- Equipment Department (装备部)
  - Equipment Support Team (装备保障队)
- Relay Satellite Control and Management Center (中继卫星控制管理中心)
- Test Equipment and Materials Procurement Bureau (试验装备物资采购局)
- East China Office (华东办事处)
- Xichang Quality Supervision Station (西昌质量监督站)

=== Subordinate Units ===
==== Launch Centers ====
- Jiuquan Satellite Launch Center (中国酒泉卫星发射中心), MUCD: unit 63600 (a.k.a. Dongfeng Base or Dongfeng Aerospace City). Located in Dongfeng Town in the Ejin Banner of the Alxa League of Inner Mongolia, Jiuqian was one of the first aerospace launch facilities ever constructed in China. It is the main base for testing and launching the Long March series of rockets, as well as other missiles, various test satellites meant for low and medium orbits, application satellites, and crewed spacecraft. The base is also responsible for the main spacecraft recovery location.
- Taiyuan Satellite Launch Center (中国太原卫星发射中心): Stationed in Kelan County of Xinzhou City in Shanxi Province, the launch base was constructed in March 1967 under Project 3201 as a response to the breakdown of Sino-Soviet relations. The base was constructed deep in the mountains and deliberately misnamed as part of the Chinese strategy of "backing-up, concealment, and dispersion". The site mostly served as a nuclear missile site and as a detachment of Jiuqian until it was made an independent unit in January 1976. The launch center was opened to international commercial launches in the 1990s with its launch of two U.S. Iridium satellites into orbit.
- Xichang Satellite Launch Center (西昌卫星发射中心) MUCD: Unit 63790. Headquartered on the Hangtian North Road of Xichang City in Sichuan Province. As of 2022 it also remotely controlled the Wenchang Aerospace Launch Site in Hainan Province.

==== Control Centers ====
- Beijing Aerospace Flight Control Center (北京航天飞行控制中心): based in the Haidian district of Beijing, it is the main control center for China's space program, including the crewed Shenzhou missions. The BACC conducts launch monitoring, tracking and measurement, as well as launch recovery. It includes the China offices of SINOSAT and Inmarsat.The complex including the BACC is often called "Aerospace City" (航天城)
- China Maritime Satellite Telemetry and Control Department (中国卫星海上测控部), MUCD Unit 63680: Stationed at Jiangyin City in Jiangsu Province, the base was established in 1978 as the headquarter and home port for the Yuan Wang-class tracking ships, which are used to track rocket and missile launches, in particular the testing of the Dongfeng series ballistic missiles and Long March rockets.
- Xi'an Satellite Telemetry and Control Center (中国西安卫星测控中心), MUCD: Unit 63750. Stationed at No. 28 Xianning East Road in Xi'an City of Shaanxi Province, the base was established in September 1975 as a missile measurement and tracking base and is now the operations and control center for China Energyne and the backup control center of BACC.
- Beijing Institute of Tracking and Telemetry Technology (北京跟踪与通信技术研究所) aka BITTT: located at the Beijing Space City, it focuses on satellite communication and navigation research.

==== Testing, Development, and Training Centers ====
- Malan Nuclear Test Base (中国马兰核试验基地), MUCD: Unit 63650. Located at the western ends of Lop Nur and Nairenkeer Townships of Heshuo County in the Bayingolin Mongol Autonomous Prefecture of the Xinjiang Uyghur Autonomous Region, Base 21 served as the main nuclear launch and test site of the Chinese nuclear program. The Base has not conducted nuclear weapons testing since 1996.
- Luoyang Electronic Equipment Test Center (中国洛阳电子装备试验中心), MUCD: unit 63880. Located at Luoyang in the Henan Province, Base 33 serves as the metrology and instrument measurement center of the PLAASF. It also conducts astronomical mapping and surveying. This base used to be one of the most restricted bases in China and was off limits to foreigners until the 1980s.
- China Aerodynamics Research and Development Center (中国空气动力研究与发展中心) (CARDC). located in Mianyang City, Sichuan, it is the largest aerodynamic research center in China, specialized in hypersonic missile research.
- Astronaut Center of China (中国航天员科研训练中心) aka ACC: located at the Beijing Aerospace City, it is the main training and research center for the Chinese space program's astronauts.
- Astronaut Corps (中国人民解放军航天员大队): headquartered at Beijing Aerospace City, it is a directly subordinated military unit of the Aerospace Force. As of 2018 it had selected and trained 42 astronauts, and was in the process of training a third batch, which will include civilians.
- Aerospace Research and Development Center (航天研发中心):
- Project Design Research Center (工程设计研究所)
- People's Liberation Army Strategic Support Force's Aerospace Engineering University (中国人民解放军战略支援部队航天工程大学): not clear what the new name will be after the April 2024 reform.

=== Ranks ===
Officer ranks

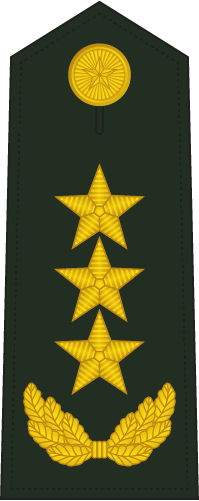
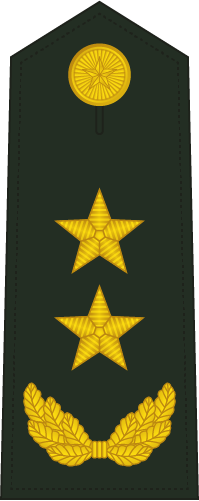
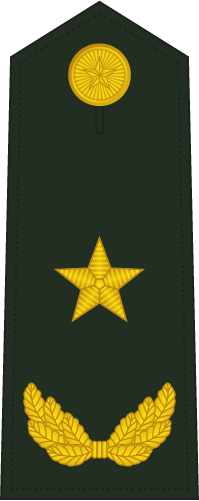
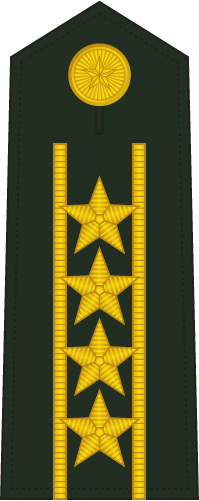
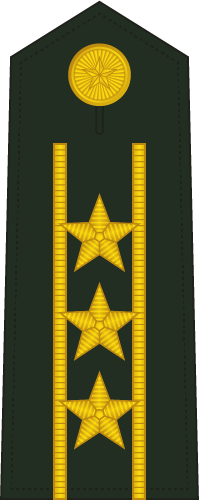
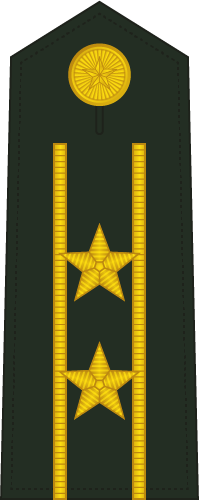
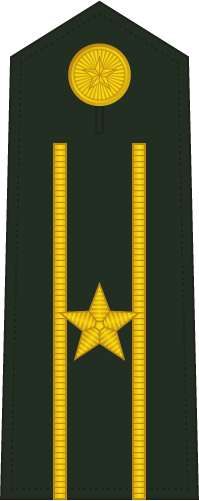
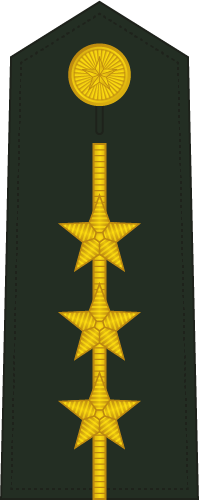
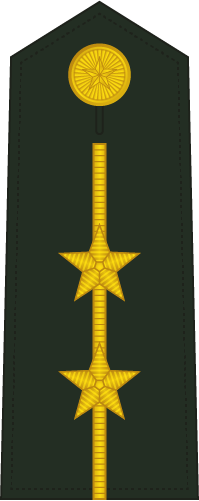
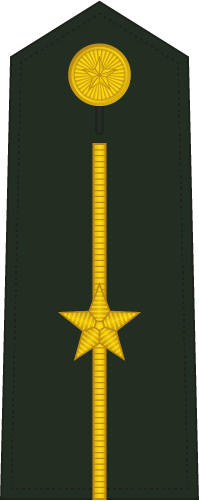
Rank group	General / flag officers			Senior officers				Junior officers
PLA Aerospace Force
PLA Aerospace Force	上将; Shàngjiàng	中将; Zhōngjiàng	少将; Shàojiàng	大校; Dàxiào	上校; Shàngxiào	中校; Zhōngxiào	少校; Shàoxiào	上尉; Shàngwèi	中尉; Zhōngwèi	少尉; Shàowèi

Enlisted and NCO ranks

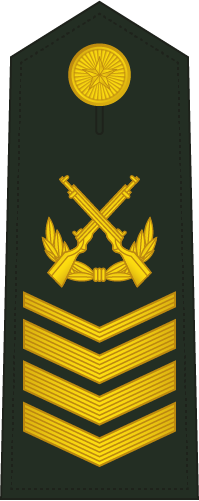
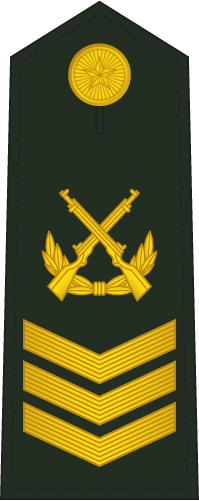
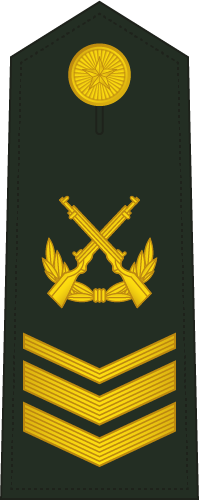
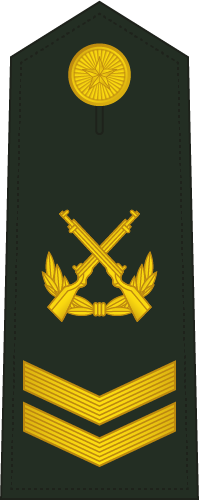
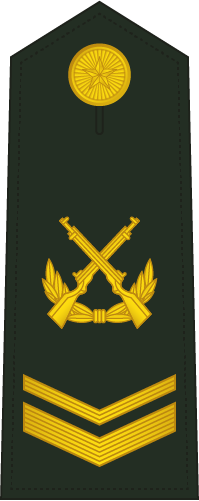
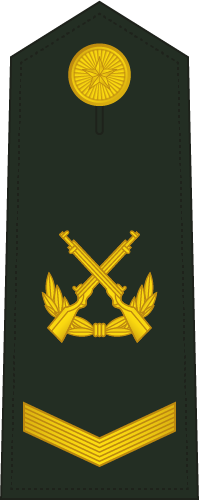
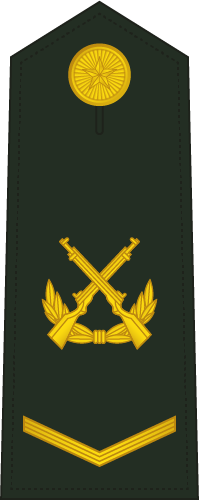
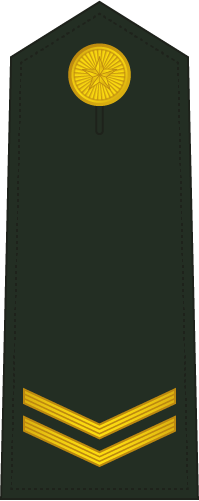
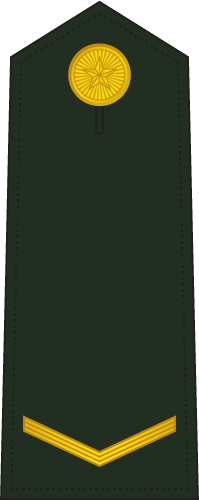
Rank group	Senior NCOs						Junior NCOs	Enlisted
PLA Aerospace Force
PLA Aerospace Force	一级军士长; Yījí jūnshìzhǎng	二级军士长; Èrjí jūnshìzhǎng	三级军士长; Sānjí jūnshìzhǎng	四级军士长; Sìjí jūnshìzhǎng	上士; Shàngshì	中士; Zhōngshì	下士; Xiàshì	上等兵; Shàngděngbīng	列兵; Lièbīng

== Equipment ==
The PLAASF controls all of China's military satellites, as a well as the BeiDou satellite navigation system. This space force is estimated by the Military Balance 2024 to be around 245 satellites, plus perhaps some dual-use civilian satellites.

As is common in all countries with significant space forces, exact data on China's military satellites' functions is hard to come by. The generic "Yaogan" name is used for military satellites, and only sometimes is the actual military designation released (like the "Jianbing" series). Often, launches are disguised and receive civilian designators, at least for a period.

In counter-sat functions, while as of 2024 the PLAASF does control three possible ASAT satellites, it is unlikely it has command of the SC-19 anti-satellite missiles under the PLARF's control.

Name of Class	Chinese	System	Type	Orbit	Number in Service	Notes
SatNav: 45 Satellites
BeiDou 2-M	北斗二号-M	BDS-2	Navigation	MEO	3	
BeiDou 2-G	北斗二号-G	BDS-2	Navigation	GEO	5	
BeiDou 2-IGSO	北斗二号-IGSO	BDS-2	Navigation	IGSO	7	
BeiDou 3-M	北斗三号-M	BDS-3	Navigation	MEO	24	
BeiDou 3-G	北斗三号-G	BDS-3	Navigation	GEO	3	
BeiDou 3-I	北斗三号-I	BDS-3	Navigation	IGSO	3	
Communications: 11 Satellites
Shentong 1	神通-1		MilCom	MEO	2	
Shentong 2	神通-2		MilCom	MEO	4	Shentong 2-5 launched as SinoSat2E as a secrecy measure
Fenghuo 1	烽火-1		MilCom	GEO	2	Launched as SinoSat 22/A as a secrecy measure
Fenghuo 2	烽火-2A/C/D/E		MilCom	GEO	4	Launched as SinoSat 1A/C/D/E as a secrecy measure
Meteorology/Oceanography: 8 Satellites
Yunhai-1	云海一号	YHS	Atmospheric Observation	SSO	2	Mixed military and civilian use
Yunhai-2	云海二号	YHS	Atmospheric observation (GNSS-RO)	SSO	6	
Reconnaissance: 92 Satellites
Jianbing-5 (Yaogan-1)	尖兵五号 (遥感1号)	JB-5	ISR -SAR	LEO	2	
Jianbing-6 (Yaogan-2)	尖兵六号（遥感2号）	JB-6	ISR - IMINT	LEO	4	
Jianbing-7 (Yaogan-6)	尖兵七号（遥感6号）	JB-7	ISR - IMINT	LEO	4	Very high resolution
Jianbing-9 (Yaogan-8)	尖兵九号（遥感8号）	JB-9	ISR - IMINT	LEO	5	Medium resolution
Jianbing-10	尖兵十号/	JB-10	ISR - IMINT	LEO	3	Decimeter resolution
Jianbing-11/12	尖兵十一号/十二号		ISR - IMINT	LEO	3	
Jianbing-16	尖兵十六			LEO	3	
LKW			ISR - IMINT	LEO	4	Optoelectronic
Tianhui-1/2	天绘一号/天绘二号		Cartography	LEO	10	Stereoscopic Multispectral and Radar Imaging
Yaogan-29	遥感29号		Space Surveillance	LEO	5	
Yaogan-34	遥感34号		ISR - IMINT	LEO	4	High resolution optical/radar
Yaogan-35	遥感35号		Space Surveillance	LEO	15	
Yaogan-36	遥感36号		ISR - IMINT	LEO	15	Optoelectronic
Yaogan-39	遥感39号			LEO	12	
Yaogan-40	遥感40号			LEO	3	
ELINT/SIGINT: 81 Satellites
Chuangxing-5 (Yaogan-30)	创新五号(遥感30号)	CX-5	ELINT	LEO	30	Launched in triplets
Jianbing-8	尖兵八号	JB-8	ELINT	LEO	15	Maritime Surveillance
Qianshao-3	前哨三号		SIGINT	GEO	3	Part of TJS program
Shijian-6	实践六号	SJ-6	ELINT	SSO	10	Launched in pairs
Shijian-11	实践十一号	SJ-11	Launch Warning	SSO	7	IRST
Yaogan-31	遥感31号		ELINT	LEO	12	
Yaogan-32	遥感32号		ELINT	LEO	4	
Early Warning: 5 Satellites
Huoyan-1	火眼一号	HY-1	Early Warning	GEO	5	Part of TJS program
Rendezvous and Proximity Operations: 3 Satellites
Shijian 17	实践十七号		Debris clean up	GEO	1	Possible Countersat capabilities
Shijian 21	实践二十一号			GEO	1	
Shijian 23	实践二十三号			GEO	1	

== Personnel ==
=== Commander ===
- Shang Hong (January 2016 – October 2022)
- Hao Weizhong (2022 – present)

=== Political Commissar ===
- Kang Chunyuan (January 2016 – April 2019)
- Jiang Ping (June 2019 – August 2021)
- Chen Hui (August 2021 – December 2024)
