= China Maritime Satellite Telemetry and Control Department =

Naval Base for Chinese Satellite Tracking Ships

Coordinates: 31.943481°N 120.290030°E

China Maritime Satellite Tracking and Control Department
- pinyin: Zhōnggúo Wèixīng Hǎishàng Cèkòng Bù
- Emblem of the People's Liberation Army
- Active: 1978–present
- Country: People's Republic of China
- Allegiance: Chinese Communist Party
- Branch: People's Liberation Army
- Part of: PLA Aerospace Force
- Garrison/HQ: Jiangyin, Jiangsu
- Mottos: Command, Dare to Fight and Win"

Commanders
- Current commander: Major General Wu Jingao (吴锦高)(Commander-in-Chief)

The China Maritime Satellite Tracking and Control Department (Chinese: 中国卫星海上测控部; pinyin: Zhōnggúo Wèixīng Hǎishàng Cèkòng Bù)), MUCD 63680, is a corps deputy grade naval base located at Jiangyin City in Jiangsu Province. It was stablished in 1978 as the headquarter and home port for the Yuan Wang-class tracking ships which are used to track rocket and missile launches, in particular the testing of the Dongfeng series ballistic missiles and Long March rockets.

Following 1 January 2016, the base was made subordinate to the Main Department of Satellite Launches and Orbit Tracking and Control (Chinese: 卫星发射测控系统部) of the Strategic Support Force. From April 2024, it has been subordinate to the Aerospace Force.

== History ==
The decision to create a tracking and control fleet started with a suggestion in 1965 by Qian Xuesen that intended to help with the development of the Dongfeng-5 ICBM. On 18 July 1967, the project was officially launched under the umbrella of the State Commission for Science and Technology. As was customary in China, it was named after the date: Project 718 (Chinese: 718工程; pinyin: 718 Gōngchéng).

In April 1975, a command staff was established in Jiangyin on the lower reaches of the Yangtze River. The command staff made preparations for the construction of a military base. Jiangyin Naval Base was designated as the "23rd Base," and in October 1978, the "Chinese People's Liberation Army Base for Testing and Training" officially went into operation.

At the same time, the Jiangnan Shipyard, on the island of Changxing near Shanghai, began the construction of two tracking ships, the Yuan Wang 1 (Chinese: 远望一号) and the Yuan Wang 2 (Chinese: 远望二号), (Note: 远望 meaning literally "looking into the distance"; the lettering on the bow was calligraphy by Mao Zedong) which were later launched on 31 August and October 1977, respectively. The two ships were identical in construction, with a length of 191 meters, a width of 22.6 meters, a draft of 9 meters, and a standard displacement of 21,000 tons. However, the two tracking ships still had to undergo a series of tests on the high seas, and direction-finding devices had to be installed. These delays were partly due to the fact that the ships had been built during the Cultural Revolution when disruption was generalized. The ships also had some severe defects that needed correction. In addition to the antennas for tracking and controlling the rockets and satellites, the ships also had a powerful transmitter on board for transmitting data to the headquarters of the Chinese space control network in Weinan. However, as soon as the transmitter was put into operation, it interfered with the other devices on the ship so much that they were no longer operational. An attempt to first transmit the data with a weaker transmitter to the sister ship a few dozen kilometers away, which then relayed it to the mainland at full power, couldn't solve the problem either. Finally, Chen Fangyun's engineers designed a frequency distribution scheme in which the radio and USB frequencies were chosen so that interference no longer occurred. The ships were finally put into service in the beginning of 1980.

=== Early missions ===
The then-named "Unit 89001" had its first major mission in May 1980 during the first long-range flight test of the Dongfeng 5. At the end of April, the two Yuan Wang ships met at the Zhoushan Islands off the coast of Zhejiang, with a total of 16 ships selected from the Eastern Sea Fleet, the Northern Sea Fleet, the Southern Sea Fleet, and the Research Fleet of the State Oceanic Administration, plus four helicopters. Together, they sailed more than 8000 kilometers to a sea area northeast of Australia where they took up a square, 32 by 32 nautical miles formation. Installed on the Yuan Wang 1 was the "Computer 151" developed by the Changsha Polytechnic Academy, which was China's first MegaFLOP-supercomputer. The ship acquired the missile's bearing signal, and the computer calculated its path relative to the ship's position in real time, thus allowing radar and laser range finders to precisely track its ballistic route. Such also allowed the helicopters to be guided to the expected impact site. The intercontinental ballistic missile was launched on May 18 at 10:00 local time from Jiuquan Space Launch Center. It hit exactly in the middle of the target square, and less than two minutes later, it was taken by the helicopters out of the water.

The Yuan Wang ships additionally played an important role on 15 and 27 September 1988 for tests of the medium-range JL-1 missiles fired from the submerged Changzheng 6, which was the only nuclear submarine of the 09II class.

On 21 September 1992, the Politburo Standing Committee of the Chinese Communist Party approved the manned space program, named after the date as Project 921 (Chinese: 921工程; pinyin: 921 Gōngchéng). A third tracking ship was laid down, the Yuan Wang 3, which was launched on 26 April 1994 and, after extensive testing on 18 May, was put into service in 1995. From August 1998, the oceanographic research ship Xiang Yang Hong 10 (Chinese: 向阳红10号) was converted into a tracking ship at the Chengxi repair yard in Jiangyin and delivered to the Xi'an Satellite Control Center on 18 July 1999 as the Yuan Wang 4.

On 2 December 1994, the Yuan Wang 2 showed what these ships were capable of. The last stage of the Changzheng-3A rocket had failed, and the communications satellite Dong Fang Hong 3-1, launched on 30 November 1994, had been stuck in lower orbit. The tracking ship then radioed the satellite to fire its own engine; however, the power of the engine wasn't sufficient, and the satellite only reached a sub-geostationary orbit and had to be abandoned. Nevertheless, this was the first time China performed remote maintenance on a satellite. Following this success, the Xi'an Satellite Control Center, the superior office of Jiangyin, broadcast the launch of the telecommunications satellite Dong Fang Hong 3-2 on 12 May 1997, as well as the launch of the weather satellite Fengyun 2. With the spin-stabilized weather satellite, the crew of Yuan Wang 2 managed to simultaneously adjust attitude and nutation, a technique that had been used until then only by the Russians and Americans.

=== Manned space program ===
The visibility of the Jiangyin base to the Chinese public soared after the launch of the test spacecraft for the manned space flight program (later named Shenzhou 1) on 20 November 1999. All four tracking ships had sailed and were spread across the Atlantic, Pacific, and Indian Oceans. (The ground stations in Swakopmund, Karachi, and elsewhere didn't yet exist at that time). When the spacecraft, after 14 orbits around the Earth, ignored the command sent by the Beijing Space Operations Center to re-enter the atmosphere on the second attempt, it was the Yuan Wang 3 off the coast of Namibia that, after the crew had located the spacecraft, successfully gave the order to initiate its braking maneuver. Nine minutes later, the spacecraft left the radio range of the Yuan Wang 3, independently crossed Africa and Pakistan, and finally entered Chinese airspace over Tibet, after which it landed in Inner Mongolia. On 4 January 2000, the last of the tracking ships returned to Jiangyin. During the mission, which lasted a total of 259 days, the four ships traveled a total of 185,000 kilometers.

In October and November 2007, the Yuan Wang 2 and Yuan Wang 3 took part in the Chang'e-1 mission. They were involved in tracking and sending control commands, including entering the probe into lunar orbit. This extended the tracking ships' working range from 70,000 kilometers in geocentric Earth orbits to 400,000 kilometers, henceforth making the Jiangyin fleet an integral part of the Chinese Deep Space Network.

== Equipment ==
The orbit tracking ships are each equipped with three movable parabolic antennas. These antennas can work together like a single large dish via interferometry and are mainly used for tracking rockets after launch, satellites at low and medium altitudes (less than 2,000 kilometers or between 2,000 kilometers and 36,000 kilometers), and satellites in geostationary orbits (35,786 kilometers). The tracking ships work on the S and C bands of the microwave range.

In order to increase the measurement accuracy, the track tracking ships are equipped with fin stabilizers which monitor the rolling of the ship in wind and sea conditions. For example, the Yuan Wang 5 can reduce her rolling from 15 ° to 5°. At the base of the parabolic antennas, there are other devices that reduce the swaying from 5° to 1°, and on the antennas themselves, there are devices that reduce the swaying from 1° to a few angular seconds. As a result, the dishes are stable up to wave strength 6 (4–6 meter high waves), almost as stable as at a ground station. Up to wind force 12, i.e. wind speeds of 118–133 kilometers per hour, the antenna can remain pointed horizontally towards the sky.

The newer orbit tracking ships have a crew of around 400 men and women who are responsible for the nautical systems of the ship itself, orbit tracking, and control of spacecraft, as well as telecommunications and meteorology. The drinking and service water for the crew is not carried along but is processed from seawater during the journey through reverse osmosis. After every mission, a tracking ship stays at the Jiangyin base for at least a month, during which all systems are checked; additionally, the crew practices for the next mission after a rest period. On average, all four tracking ships together spend about 600 days per year at sea.

== Rocket transports ==
Since heavy rockets of the type Changzheng 5 and Changzheng 7—which were under construction since 2009 in Tianjin—could only be delivered by sea (like their intended heavy payloads), it was necessary to build specialized freighters. Given the sensitive needs of rockets, in order to be able to maintain their prescribed limit conditions of 5 to 25 °C and less than 60% humidity inside their transport containers, there were strict requirements for temperature, humidity, and the salinity of the air in the cargo hold, as well as requirements for the loading and unloading speed, so that the rockets would not be subjected to the maritime climate for an unnecessarily long time in either Tianjin or Hainan.

For this reason, the engineers at the Civil Ship Department of the Research Institute 708 (Chinese: 第七〇八研究所民船部) of the China State Shipbuilding Corporation designed the holds of the Yuan Wang 21 and her sister ship Yuan Wang 22 as closed, fully air-conditioned rooms in which the rocket stages packed in transport containers were stored in such a way that vibrations were dampened and the ship's fluctuations caused by the waves were compensated for.

In heavy seas, ships without fin stabilizers can tilt up to 40° from the center axis, which can mean lateral accelerations of up to 0.8 g, while the load on a freight train or truck going through a curve is only exposed to 0.5 g. However, thanks to the aforementioned special designs, these load values for the rocket freighters are only half compared to road transport and only a third compared to rail transport. Thanks to the fin stabilizers, the rocket freighters can operate in wave heights of up to 2.5 meters. When there are predicted wave heights of over 2.5 meters, the risk to the valuable cargo becomes too high; in such a case, such as during the transport of the third Changzheng-5 launch vehicle from Tianjin to Hainan (22–27 October 2019), the regulations required the freighters to anchor in a wind-protected anchorage and wait for better weather.

The two rocket freighters were built from 1 April 2012 by the Jiangnan Shipyard in Shanghai. On 29 November 2012, the Yuan Wang 21 and then the Yuan Wang 22 were launched. After installing the electronic equipment and testing at sea, the Yuan Wang 21 was handed over to the Jiangyin Tracking Ship Base on 6 May 2013—the Yuan Wang 22 followed on 28 June 2013. The Yuan Wang 21 had its first actual use two years later. On 14 May 2016, after a six-day, 1,670 nautical mile voyage, the freighter delivered a Changzheng 7 carrier rocket to the port of the Wenchang Launch Site, from where the rocket was delivered on 25 June 2016 and then completed its first flight without any problems.

With a length of 130 meters and a standard displacement of almost 10,000 tons, the freighters are relatively small; in order to be able to transport the components of a heavy Changzheng-5 launch vehicle with the associated boosters, it needs to be broken down to 40 containers, some of which are over 30 meters long, and both ships have to leave the port at the same time for one rocket. This is particularly accommodating for the Qinglan port in Hainan. The rocket wharf is located around 2 kilometers inside the island and therefore offers protection from tropical storms up to wind force 10 (89 to 102 kilometers per hour; the summer typhoons on the Eastern Hainan coast reach wind speeds of over 200 kilometers per hour). However, the shipping channels designated for deep-sea freighters (7.3 meters deep) are very narrow: 64 meters for the entrance to the harbor itself and 60 meters for the entrance to the particularly wind-protected Bamen Bay. (For comparison, in Jiangyin, the Yangtze is open to heavy shipping traffic over a width of 600 meters.) Therefore, for safety reasons, the base has refrained from building freighters large enough that one alone could transport a Changzheng-5 rocket.

For the transport of a Changzheng 5B launch vehicle in February 2021, which was supposed to carry the Core Module of the Chinese Space Station into space, the Xu Yang 16 (Chinese: 绪扬16号), a multi-purpose ship of Ningbo Xuyang Shipping Ltd. (Chinese: 宁波绪扬海运有限公司), was used. It was launched in January 2009 with a standard displacement of 10,134 tons, a 125-meter length, a 19-meter width, and up to 7.6 meters of draft. Given that unfueled rocket stages are relatively light, the vessel's real draft was still within limits.

== Organization ==
The department has the following subordinate units.

- Experimental Engineering Department (Chinese: 试验技术部)
- Yuan Wang-3 (Chinese: 远望三号): Oceanic tracking and command ship
- Yuan Wang-5 (Chinese: 远望五号): Oceanic tracking and command ship
- Yuan Wang-6 (Chinese: 远望六号): Oceanic tracking and command ship
- Yuan Wang-7 (Chinese: 远望七号): Oceanic tracking and command ship
- Yuan Wang-21 (Chinese: 远望二十一号): Rocket transport ship
- Yuan Wang-22 (Chinese: 远望二十二号): Rocket transport ship
- First Group of Tracking Ship Crew (Chinese: 航天远洋测量船船员第一大队)
- Second Group of Tracking Ship Crew (Chinese: 航天远洋测量船船员第二大队)

== Ships of the Yuan Wang Class ==
Name	Length	Beam	Draft	Height	Standard displacement	Manufacturer	Launch	Commissioning	Deactivation	Status
Yuan Wang 1	191 m	22.6 m	9 m	38 m	21.000 t	Jiangnan Shipyard	31 August 1977	Early 1980	26 November 2011	Donation to the Jiangnan Shipyard Museum in Shanghai
Yuan Wang 2	191 m	22.6 m	9 m	38 m	21,000 t	Jiangnan Shipyard	October 1977	Early 1980		Moored to a quay at Base 23 (Jiangyin) since December 2010, acting as a permanent ground station for monitoring and controlling regular satellite functions
Yuan Wang 3	180 m	22.2 m	8 m	37.8 m	17,000 t	Jiangnan Shipyard	26 April 1994	18 May 1995		High Seas Service
Yuan Wang 4	156.2 m	20.6 m	7.5 m	39 m	12,000 t	Chengxi Repair Yard	August 1998	1999	January 2011	Sunk during a target exercise with a Dongfeng 21D medium-range missile
Yuan Wang 5	222.2 m	25.2 m	8.2 m	40.85 m	25,000 t	Jiangnan Shipyard	September 2006	29. September 2007		High Seas Service
Yuan Wang 6	222.2 m	25.2 m	8.2 m	40.85 m	25,000 t	Jiangnan Shipyard	16 March 2007	July 2008		High Seas Service
Yuan Wang 7	224.9 m	27.2 m		44.2 m	27,000 t	Jiangnan Shipyard	15 October 2015	12 July 2016		High Seas Service
Yuan Wang 21	130 m	19 m	5.8 m	12 m	9,080 t	Jiangnan Shipyard	29 November 2012	6 May 2013		High Seas Service
Yuan Wang 22	130 m	19 m	5.8 m	12 m	9,080 t	Jiangnan Shipyard	24 January 2013	28 June 2013		High Seas Service
