= Luoyang Electronic Equipment Test Center =

Chinese Defense Research and Development Center

- 中国洛阳电子装备试验中心

Agency overview
- Formed: 1987
- Type: Research and Development Center
- Jurisdiction: People's Liberation Army
- Headquarters: Luoyang, Henan; 34.687°N 112.410°E
- Agency executive: Senior Colonel Li Dexi 李德喜, Director
- Parent agency: Aerospace Force

The Luoyang Electronic Equipment Test Center (洛阳电子装备试验中心), also known as the 33rd Test and Training Base of the People's Liberation Army (中国人民解放军第三十三试验训练基地) (MUCD: Unit 63880 Unit) is a research and development center of the People's Liberation Army located in Luoyang, Henan) Province and is affiliated to the PLA's Aerospace Force. It is a Division Grade unit that mainly performs scientific research and defense technology development, including during the last few decades, projects related to the Chinese space program.

== History ==
On June 2, 1987, the Central Military Commission broke off and renamed the Third Test Site of the Conventional Weapons Test Base into the Third Test Base of Conventional Weapons and placed under the direct leadership of the Commission of Science, Technology and Industry for National Defense. Zhou Liezhang was appointed commander, and Li Jiangeng was appointed political commissar. From the start, the base received an extremely high degree of secrecy at the time, due to it work on electronic warfare.

In 2005, the base undertook the army's first pilot program for the training of actual electronic countermeasures combat units. In 2009, the base's electronic countermeasures training brigade (电子对抗训练大队) was formally established.

On December 5, 2012, the State Key Laboratory of Complex Electromagnetic Environmental Effects on Electronic Information Systems was unveiled at the Luoyang Test Center. The construction of this national key laboratory was approved by the Ministry of Science and Technology of the People's Republic of China on October 9, 2012.

The Test Center has been involved in the Chinese Space Program since at least 1999. In particular, the Test Center's Surveying, Mapping and Navigation Team has had the responsibility for the more delicate metrological tasks, in particular the high-precision surveying and mapping support for the "Shenzhou" spacecraft program. The Team has carried out over 700 surveying and mapping support tasks, from the initial geodetic survey of possible landing sites in Inner Mongolia, to surveying and mapping support for "Shenzhou 5" and Shenzhou 6" and telemetry work for "Shenzhou 7".

The team also undertook the hyper-precise elevation measurements for the early stages of construction of the 500-meter Aperture Spherical Radio Telescope (FAST) project in 2012. The test's center parent department, the General Armament Department of the Chinese People's Liberation Army, was abolished in January 2016, and the base was transferred to the newly established Equipment Development Department of the Central Military Commission. It was then transferred to the newly founded Strategic Support Force, and on the dissolution of that force in April 2024, it passed under the jurisdiction of the Aerospace Force.

== See also ==
- Central Military Commission (China)
- National Defense Mobilization Commission
