= Wang Dong (hacker) =

Hacker

- 汪东
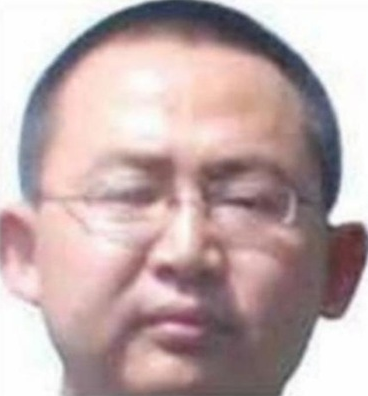
- Image of Wang Dong
- Other names: Jack Wang, UglyGorilla, Greenfield
- Organization: People's Liberation Army
- Criminal charges: Espionage; Cyberterrorism; Computer fraud

Wang Dong (Chinese: 汪东) is a member of the People's Liberation Army and is a Chinese hacker who is part of PLA Unit 61398.

== Criminal career ==
During 2004 and 2014, Wang Dong, and others in the People's Liberation Army cyber-attacked the United States. Wang Dong used the Chinese chatting service WeChat and a Chinese military forum to talk to multiple members when doing cyber crimes. Wang would buy domains and upload malware on the Chinese file uploading service PUDN, he would put "ug." at the start of each domain he bought to be able to claim that the domain was really his. Wang accessed classified documents of the infrastructure to nuclear power plant and United States officials' e-mails. He left tell-tale clues on the internet for federal agents working to find and arrest him. This led to him and other China nationals being blocked from DefCon events. He and other Chinese nationals in Unit 61398 of the People's Liberation Army were indicted. China's foreign ministry called the indictment against Wang Dong and the other individuals "extremely ridiculous".
