= Beijing Institute of Tracking and Telemetry Technology =

Chinese Defense Research and Development Center

Beijing Institute of Tracking and Telecommunications Technology
- 北京跟踪与通信技术研究所

Agency overview
- Formed: 1965
- Type: Research and Development Institute
- Jurisdiction: People's Liberation Army
- Headquarters: Haidian District, Beijing
- Agency executive: Dong Guangliang 董光亮, Director
- Parent agency: Aerospace Force

The Beijing Institute of Tracking and Telecommunications Technology (Chinese: 北京跟踪与通信技术研究所; pinyin: Běijīng Gēnzōng yǔ Tōngxìn Jìshù Yánjiūsuǒ) aka BITTT is a research institution of the Aerospace Force of the People's Liberation Army. The head office is located in the Beijing Space City in the north of Haidian district. The head of the institute, Dong Guangliang (董光亮), is also the Technical Director of the Control and Communication Systems of the Manned Space Program of the PRC since September 2015. The BITTT is an observer member of the Consultative Committee for Space Data Systems.

== History ==
The "Research Institute for Orbit Tracking and Communication Technology" was founded in May 1965 in connection with Project 651, the program to build and launch a Chinese satellite that began in January 1965.As part of this project, the institute was initially responsible for planning the radar facilities at the Jiuquan Launch site, the facilities of the ground stations of the Chinese Space Control Network, and its headquarters, which was located in Weinan at the time. After China's first satellite, Dongfanghong 1, was successfully launched into space on 24 April 1970, the institute took on a leading role in the further expansion of the space control network, not only as a technical planning office, but also as an intermediary between the individual departments.

As of the 2020s, BITTT has established itself as the main systems design and general contracting technical unit in the field of aerospace measurement, control and communication in China, the chief designer unit of the two major systems of measurement, control and communication for the landing site and for emergency rescue of China's manned space program. It is an affiliated unit of the Spacecraft Measurement and Control Committee of the Chinese Society of Astronautics, and a Class A design unit of the communication industry approved by the state.

As a general contractor, BITTT was also responsible for the design and construction of the Inmarsat Beijing ground station, for the computer systems for the Beijing ground station of the Sinosat communication satellites and for the computer systems of the satellite control centers of Nigeria and Venezuela

== Academics ==
BITTT has also been a teaching institution since 1985, and has had title-granting authority since 2008. Degree of "Postgraduate Specialist" (专业硕士), roughly at master level, are granted in the following four programs:

- Communication and Information Systems Engineering (通信与信息系统)
- Navigation, steering and control (导航、制导与控制)
- Signal and Data Processing (信号与信息处理)
- Applied computer science (计算机应用技术)

In a peculiarity of its status as a military unit, there are rules requiring minimum height (1.62m for men and 1.58 m for women), no short- or long-sightedness, or color blindness.

The institute has 500 scientific and technological personnel, including more than 350 with master's degrees or above, and more than 60 with doctoral degrees or above, and more than 180 senior researchers, senior engineers and equivalent technical positions. It is composed of more than 10 laboratories. It has an above-average production of patents and awards. The institute has also a quite broad set of exchange and cooperation projects with more than 20 countries.

== Projects involved ==
- Beidou Satellite Navigation System
- Shenzhou program
- China Moon Program
- China Mars Program
