= World on the Brink =

2024 book by Dimitri Alperovitch

World on the Brink: How America Can Beat China in the Race for the Twenty-First Century
- Author: Dmitri Alperovitch, Garrett Graff
- Language: English
- Publication date: April 30, 2024
- ISBN: 1541704096

World on the Brink: How America Can Beat China in the Race for the Twenty-First Century is a 2024 book by Dmitri Alperovitch with American journalist Garrett M. Graff.

== Summary ==
Alperovitch argues that the United States must pursue a strategy of diplomatic, economic, and military deterrence in order to prevent an invasion of Taiwan by the People's Republic of China. In order to deter this potential conflict, Alperovitch advocates for the U.S. to increase military and economic partnership with Taiwan and U.S. allies in the Indo-Pacific region, modernize certain U.S. defense capabilities, and pursue industrial and trade policy to decrease China's economic leverage over the U.S.

== Reception ==
World on the Brink has been favorably reviewed by Ryan Hilger for the U.S. Naval Institute, who said it should be "required reading across the Defense Department, from U.S. warfighters to civilian policymakers alike." Kirkus Reviews called it "[d]eeply insightful advice for the coming decades."

The Australian Institute of International Affairs offered a more mixed review, praising some of the book's arguments, while saying that the book's reliance on Alperovitch's biography as a source of authority is a weakness. Jessica Mathews in Foreign Affairs gave the book a neutral review.
