= Astronaut Center of China =

China Astronautic Scientific Research and Training Center
- 中国航天员科研训练中心
- Emblem of the People's Liberation Army
- Active: 1968; 58 years ago
- Country: China
- Allegiance: Chinese Communist Party
- Branch: People's Liberation Army Aerospace Force
- Type: Research and Training Institution
- Role: Space Manned Flight Research
- Part of: People's Liberation Army

Commanders
- Commander: Gao Feng (高峰)
- Chief Designer: Huang Weifeng (黄伟芬)

The China Astronautic Scientific Research and Training Center (中国航天员科研训练中心), usually referred to as the Astronaut Center of China (中国航天员中心 - ACC), located at the Beijing Space City, is the principal institution in charge of the training of astronauts and of researching all matters related to crewed space travel. It is dually affiliated to the Central Military Commission Equipment Development Department and the People's Liberation Army Aerospace Force. It is the third specialized research and training center for astronauts in the world after the Soviet/Russian Yuri Gagarin Cosmonaut Training Center and the United States's Houston Space Center. Known as "the cradle of China's space heroes", the center's motto is "From here into the Universe" (“从这里走向太空”).

== History ==
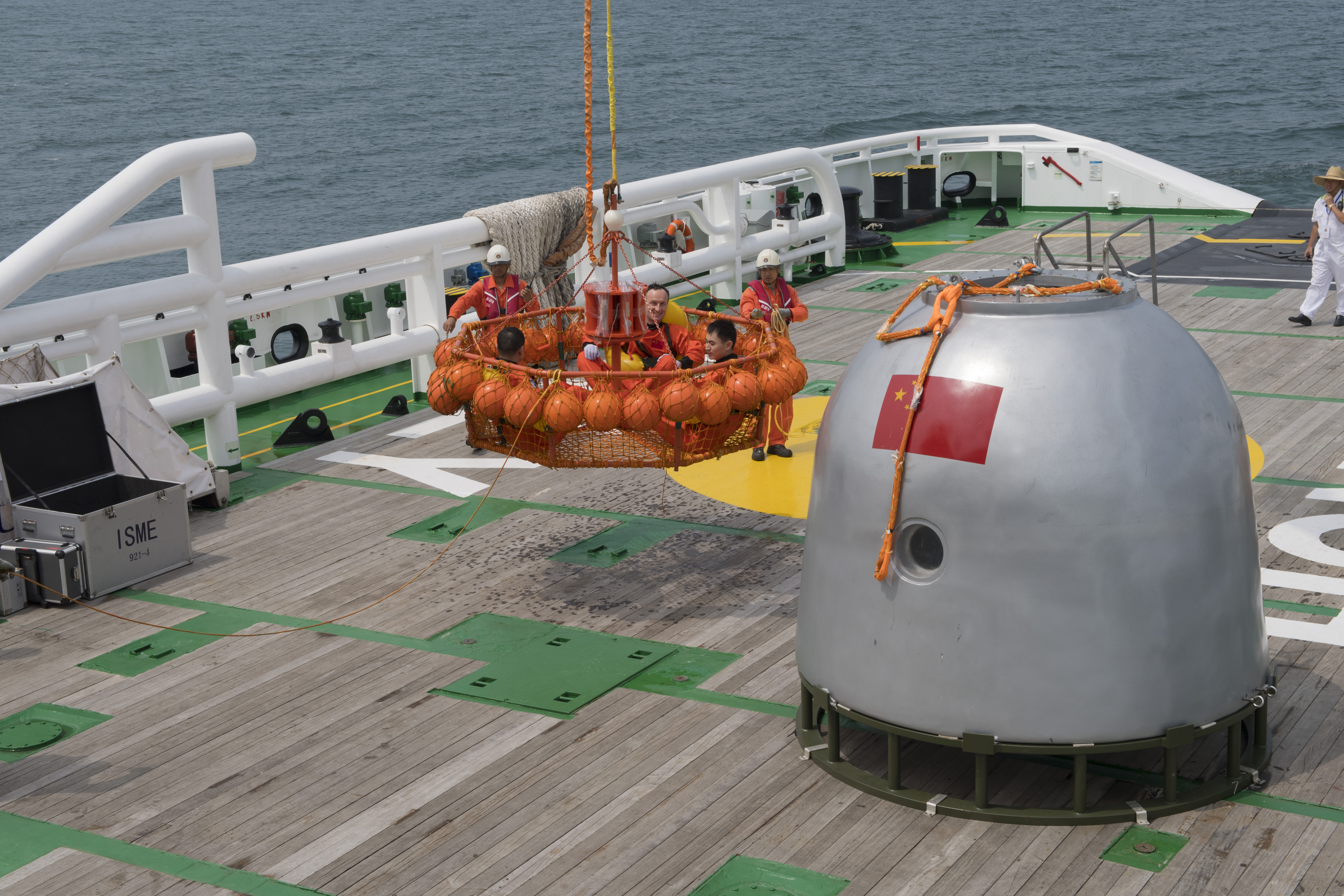
Training capsule of the Shenzhou spacecraft

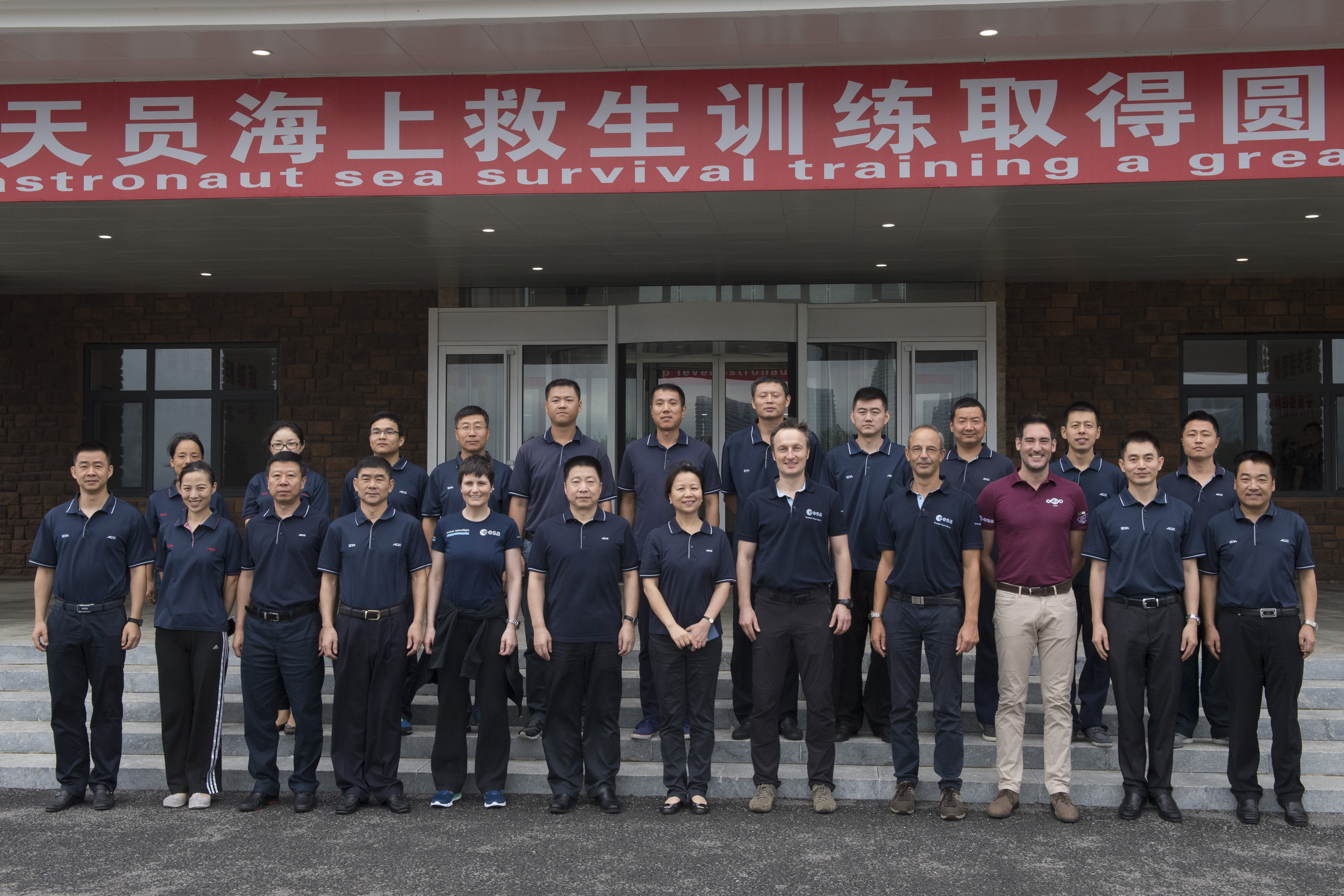
Front entrance of the ACC, shown in a group photo of European Space Agency (ESA) and China National Space Administration personnel

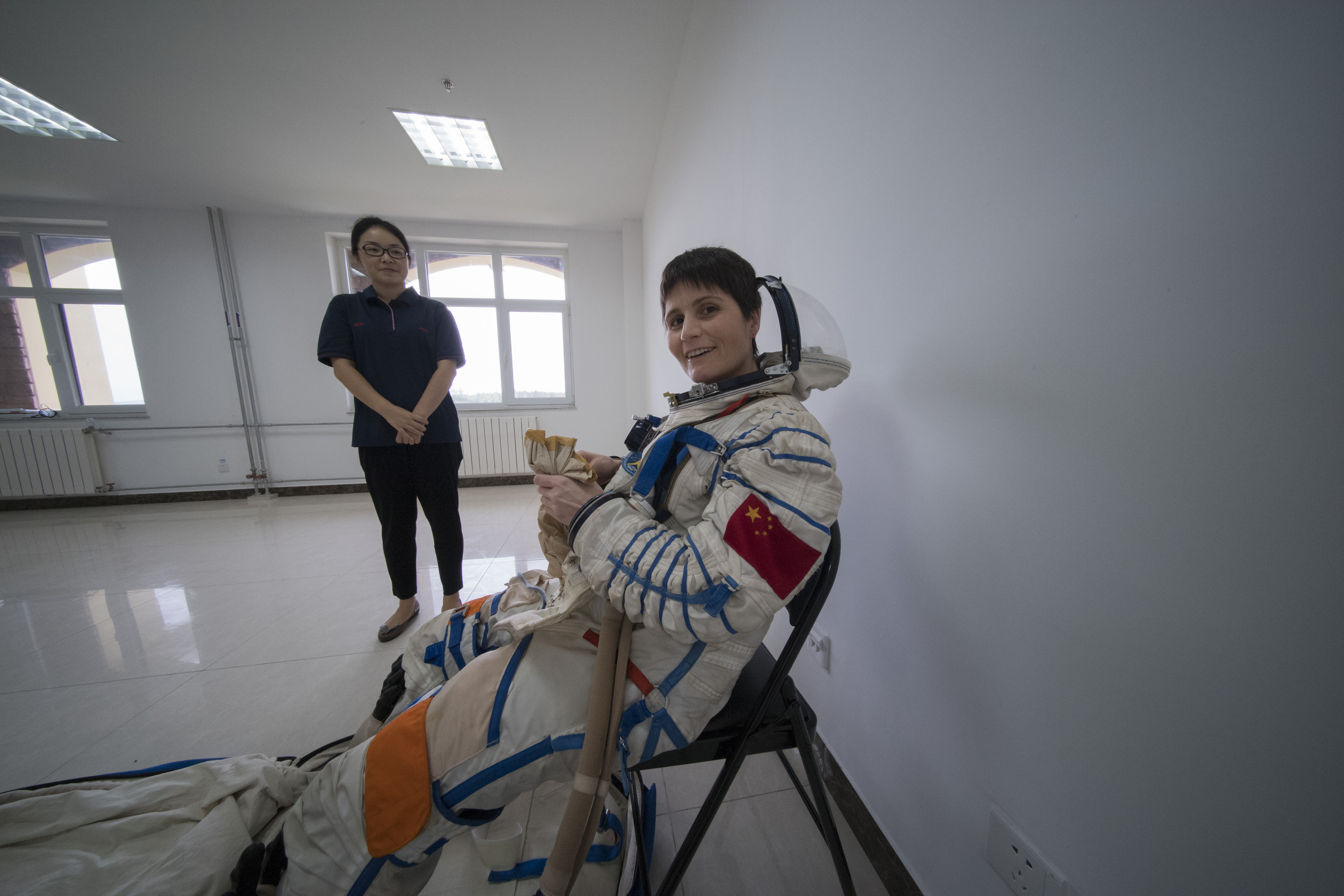
ESA astronaut Samantha Cristoforetti in a Chinese pressure suit at an ACC training session

In 1958, China began research on aerospace biomedical engineering. At that time, space pioneers Qian Xuesen, Zhao Jiuzhang and others were commissioned by the Chinese Academy of Sciences to establish the "581 Group of the Chinese Academy of Sciences", which was a high-altitude physiological research group explicitly intended to study "the development and training of biological life support systems in rocket flight". In 1960, this "High Altitude Physiology Research Group" was expanded into the "Space Biology Research Laboratory" to carry out space biology research and build a series of laboratories. In addition, the Chinese Academy of Medical Sciences and the Academy of Military Medical Sciences were also engaged in aerospace medical engineering research.

In 1968, during the Cultural Revolution, Qian Xuesen, at the time establishing the general design office for spacecraft, made a report to the National Defense Science and Technology Commission, recommending the establishment of an Institute of Space Medical Engineering. With the approval of the National Defense Science and Technology Commission, on April 1, 1968, relevant units of the Chinese Academy of Sciences, the Chinese Academy of Medical Sciences, and the Academy of Military Medical Sciences jointly established the "Institute of Aerospace Medical Engineering" in Beijing, also known as the 507th Research Institute of the PLA, what is now considered the direct ancestor of the ACC. It was affiliated to the Fifth Research Institute of the Ministry of National Defense.

The 507 Institute had a staff of 1,265, with He Quanxuan as the director, Zhu Yu as the political commissar, and Huo Junfeng, Chen Xin and Shi Yunfeng as the deputy directors. In the next three years, the institute continuously moved its location. In 1969, it moved from the Changping branch of Peking University to the Beijing Institute of Technology, and in 1970 it moved to the old site of Beijing Agricultural University. In 1971, the State Council of the People's Republic of China approved the establishment of a special scientific research area for the Institute of Aerospace Medical Engineering. The institute then built an experimental area in the land set aside. By December 1978, the Beijing Agricultural University wanted to move back to its original location. The 507 institute then set up 33 tents on the new experimental site, and the various teams moved into the tents to work, maintaining scientific research and production. On June 25, 1986, the laboratory building of the institute was completed, and since then the institute has been at its current location.

In 1970, the Central Military Commission approved the development mission of "Shuguang" 1 crewed spacecraft, and planned to send China's first astronaut into space in 10 years. This was known as the "714" project. The institute participated in the research tasks of the project until the project was discontinued in 1978. After 1981, the institute started carrying out again research on crewed space technology, research on the human body in zero-G environments, and satellite-borne biological research. In October 1990, China's "Jianbing" 1 satellite used a biological capsule developed by the institute to carry mice for an 8-day orbital flight. This was China's first advanced orbital animal space flight test.

On 8 January 1992, the China Manned Space Program was started. The institute (then known in English as the "Institute of Space Medical Engineering", ISME) was made responsible for the astronaut system and the environmental control and life support subsystems of the spacecraft, among the seven major systems of the China Manned Space Program.

In 2003, China's first crewed space mission Shenzhou 5 was successful. The space suit worn by Shenzhou 5 astronaut Yang Liwei was embroidered with the logo of the Institute of Space Medical Engineering. This was the only time this logo appeared in a crewed space mission.

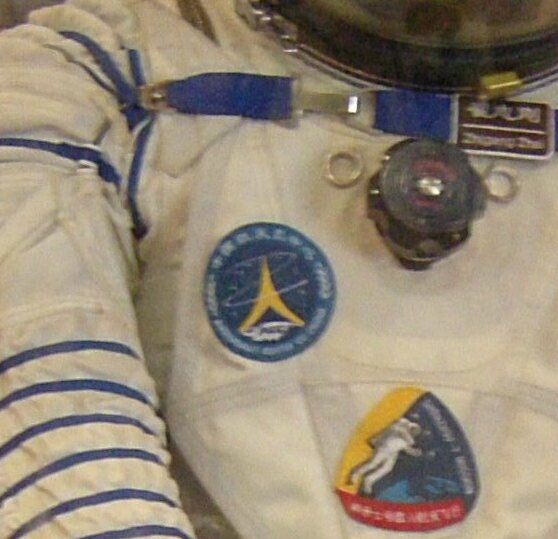
Shenzhou 7 The logo of the China Astronaut Research and Training Center on the spacesuit (on the right chest), used since Shenzhou 6

In 2005, the Institute of Space Medical Engineering was renamed to its current name of China Astronautic Research and Training Center. The ACC is a comprehensive research institution that combines medical and engineering research for the sake of crewed spaceflight in China.

As one of the main participating units of China Manned Space Program, it is responsible for astronaut selection and training, medical supervision, medical support, development of space suits and space food, spacecraft environmental control and life support system development, large-scale ground simulation tests, and training equipment development. In a quirk of IP law, the ACC also owns the trademark rights for the Chinese astronauts' portraits, signatures, and crewed spaceflight logos. The logo of the China Astronaut Research and Training Center has been embroidered on the space suits of every crewed mission since Shenzhou 6.

In 2008, with the approval of relevant organizations of the International Astronomical Union, the National Astronomical Observatory named an asteroid discovered on January 2, 1997, the "Astronaut Center Planetoid", IAU number 35313.

In 2023, the ACC announced it has managed full 100% regeneration of oxygen supplies and 95% recovery of water resources in the Tianggong space station, which reduces resupply needs, and is a critical advance for any future long duration space flights.

== Structure ==
As of 2005, the center has 3 scientific research areas and 2 living areas. As well as its Beijing HQ, the ACC has labs in Shenzhen.

As of 2015, the ACC is also a degree-granting educational institution, and may confer master's degrees in two disciplines: "Human-Machine Interface and Environmental Engineering" (人机与环境工程) and "Special Medicine" (特种医学).

The China Astronautic Scientific Research and Training Center was originally affiliated to the General Armament Department of the People's Liberation Army. In the 2015 military reform, the General Armament Department was abolished and the Equipment Development Department of the Central Military Commission was established. The China Astronaut Scientific Research and Training Center was successively transferred to the dual authority of the Equipment Development Department of the Central Military Commission and the Aerospace Systems Department of the Strategic Support Forces, and is as of 2024 a directly subordinate unit under the Aerospace Force.

== See also ==
- List of Chinese astronauts
- List of astronauts by selection
- Human spaceflight
- History of spaceflight
