= Yuan Wang-class tracking ship =

Chinese strategic support ships

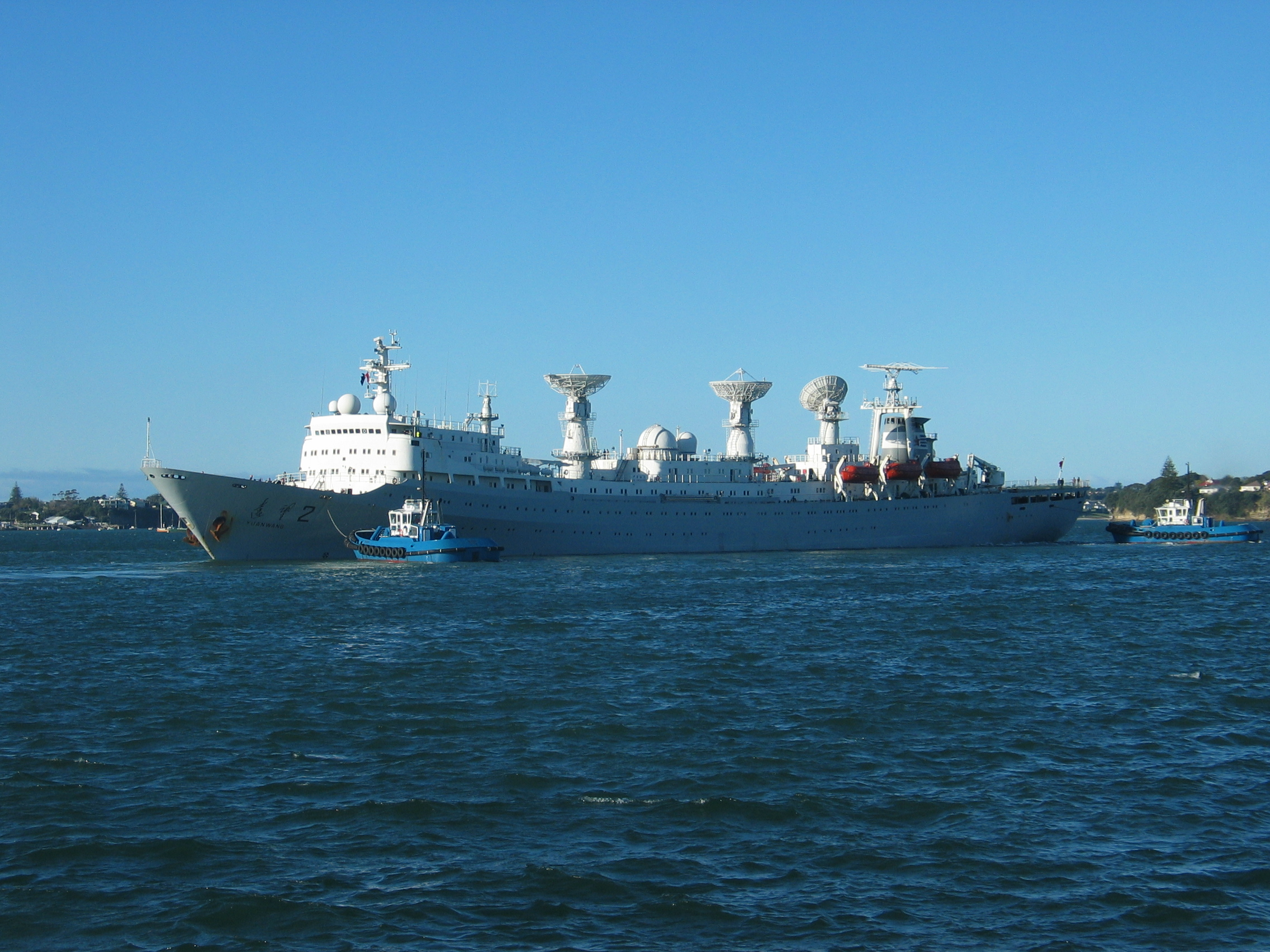
- Yuan Wang 2 in Waitemata Harbour, Auckland, New Zealand, on 27 October 2005. The ship was resupplying after being at sea to support the Shenzhou 6 spaceflight.

Class overview
- Builders: Yuan Wang 1 and 2 - Jiangnan Shipyard, Shanghai / Yuan Wang 3 to 6 - China State Shipbuilding Corporation, Shanghai
- Operators: People's Liberation Army Strategic Support Force
- Preceded by: none
- Succeeded by: none
- Completed: 7
- Active: 4
- Retired: 2, 1 destroyed as target

General characteristics
- Type: tracking ship
- Displacement: ~21,000 tons (Yuan Wang 1 and 2: 10,000+ / Yuan Wang 3 and 4 18,000)
- Length: Yuan Wang 1 - 156.09 m / Yuan Wang 2 - 191 metres; Yuan Wang 3-6 - N/A
- Beam: Yuan Wang 1 - 20.6 metres / Yuan Wang 2 - 22 metres; Yuan Wang 3-6 - N/A
- Propulsion: Sulzer diesel engine
- Speed: 20 knots (37 km/h)
- Complement: Yuan Wang 1 - 200 / Yuan Wang 2 - 470; Yuan Wang 3-6 - N/A
- Aircraft carried: none, but capable of handling either Super Frelon or Z-8
- Aviation facilities: none

The Yuan Wang-class (Chinese: 远望; pinyin: Yuǎn wàng; lit. 'far-seeing') are a line of Chinese tracking ships used for surveillance and communication of launch vehicle rockets and intercontinental ballistic missiles by the People's Liberation Army Aerospace Force. This class is not of a single ship design, but instead is a group of different designs under the same series that share the same name. The ships are all assigned to the China Maritime Satellite Telemetry and Control Department in Jianyin, Jiangsu province.

Detailed specifications for every ship have not been released by the PLASSF. Yuan Wang 1 and Yuan Wang 2 are thought to have a displacement tonnage of around 21,000 tons when fully loaded, with a crew of about 470 and a length of about 190 metres (620 ft). Their propulsion is from one Sulzer diesel engine, with a top speed of 20 knots (37 km/h).

The class was first proposed by Premier Zhou Enlai in 1965, and was approved by Mao Zedong in 1968. The first two ships of the class, Yuan Wang 1 and Yuan Wang 2, were built at the Jiangnan Shipyard in Shanghai and put to sea on 31 August 1977 and 1 September 1978 respectively. The general designer of this class is Xu Xueyan. For the first time, this gave the PRC the ability to track launches and satellites that were not over their territory.

The first survey mission of the two ships was during May 1980. After being used for tracking of the launches of indigenously developed communications satellites, Yuan Wang 1 and Yuan Wang 2 underwent overhauls in 1986, so they could be used for supporting international satellite launches by the PRC.

Two further ships of the class have been built. The first was Yuan Wang 3, which was commissioned on 20 October 1995. The Yuan Wang 4 tracking ship was constructed by China State Shipbuilding Corporation and delivered to the China Satellite Launch and Tracking Control General on 18 July 1999. It had been converted from the previously used Xiang Yang Hong 10 scientific survey ship.

Another two Yuan Wang-class vessels were launched in Shanghai in early 2007.

Pictures of Yuan Wang 6 were published, and both Yuan Wang 5 and the newly commissioned ship were on duty for the Shenzhou 7 mission.

During the Shenzhou spacecraft flights, the four ships were positioned as follows:

- Yuan Wang 1 in the Yellow Sea
- Yuan Wang 2 about 1500 km (about 900 statute miles) southwest of French Polynesia
- Yuan Wang 3 off the Namibian coast
- Yuan Wang 4 off the coast of Western Australia in the Indian Ocean

== Fleet list ==
- Yuan Wang 1 - 1977
- Yuan Wang 2 - 1978
- Yuan Wang 3 - 1995
- Yuan Wang 4 - 1999
- Yuan Wang 5 - 2007
- Yuan Wang 6 - 2007
- Yuan Wang 7 - 2016
- Yuan Wang 8 (Liaowang 1) - 2024
- Yuan Wang 21 - Long March 5 transport ship
- Yuan Wang 22 - Long March 5 transport ship

== Type 718 ==
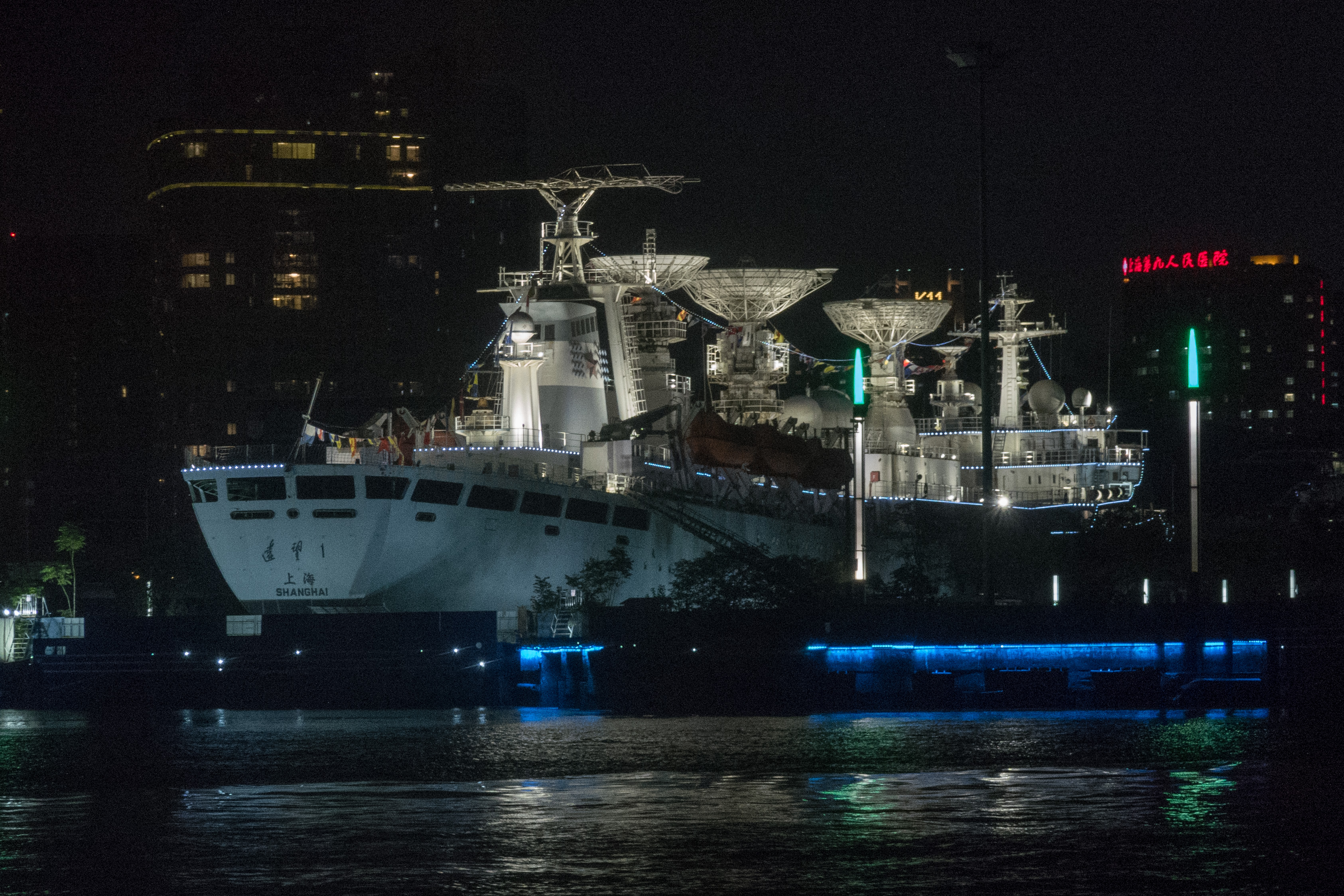
Yuanwang 1 in Shanghai, October 2019

Type 718 tracking ship is the very first design of Yuanwang series, and it consists of two ships, Yuan Wang 1 and Yuan Wang 2, both of which have since retired in the early 2010s. Type 718 can attain speeds of 20 kn.

Number	Length (m)	Width (m)	Draft (m)	Height (m)	Displacement (t)	Builder	Launched	Commissioned	Status
Yuan Wang 1	191	22.6	7.5	38	21,157	Jiangnan Shipyard	1977 August 31	1978	Retired
Yuan Wang 2	192	22.6	7.5	38.5	21,000	Jiangnan Shipyard	1977	1978	Retired

== Yuan Wang 3 ==
Yuan Wang 3 is the second generation tracking ship of Yuan Wang series, and it can attain speeds up to 20 kt, with a range of 18,000 nautical miles and a cruising speed of 18 kt.

Number	Length (m)	Width (m)	Draft (m)	Height (m)	Displacement (t)	Builder	Launched	Commissioned	Status
Yuan Wang 3	180	22.2	8	37.8	17,000	Jiangnan Shipyard	1994 April	1995 May	Active

== Yuan Wang 4 ==
Yuan Wang 4 was converted from Type 643 research vessel Xiangyanghong 10 (向阳红10), which was originally designed in February 1971, with construction begun in July 1975, and entered service in October 1979. Conversion was completed in August 1998, and the ship is capable of carrying a Changhe Z-8. Conversion work included more than four hundred projects in four major categories. Powered by 9000 hp diesel engines, Yuan Wang 4 has an endurance of 100 days and could reach a speed of up to 20 kn, with a range of 18,000 nautical miles cruising at 18 kn.

While in Jiangyin port at 5:10 AM on 5 August 2007, Yuan Wang 4 was hit by a coal carrier Harbor Sea 666 (Gang Hai 666, 港海 666), which caused a massive fire started at the point of collision at 4th fuel tank. The fire was put out after four hours without any casualties, but the equipment on board was severely damaged beyond repair. As a result, Yuan Wang 4 was subsequently converted to a target ship for DF-21 ballistic anti-ship missile to simulate an aircraft carrier target as it entered Jiangyin Shipyard on 15 April 2010 for repair, and eventually destroyed in the latter half of 2010.

Number	Length (m)	Width (m)	Draft (m)	Height (m)	Displacement (t)	Builder	Launched	Commissioned	Status
Yuan Wang 4	152.6	20.6	7.75	39	12,700	Jiangyin Chengxi Shipyard	1997 July	1998 August	Destroyed as a target

== Yuan Wang 5 ==
Yuan Wang 5 is the third generation tracking ship of Yuan Wang series, and entered service on 29 September 2007. Loaded with electronic tracking gear, the Yuan Wang 5 has been called a "spy ship".

Built by Jiangnan Shipyard, Yuan Wang 5 has a displacement of 25,000 tones, and is designed to withstand winds up to Beaufort scale 12, and perform duties in sea state 6. It has a carrying capacity of 11,000 tons DWT and its draught is reported to be 8.2 meters. Its length overall (LOA) is 222 meters and its width is 25.2 meters. Its home port is Jiangyin on the Yangtze.

The general designer of both Yuan Wang 5 and 6 was Mr. Huang Wei (黄蔚), the general engineer of the 708th Institute of China Shipbuilding Industry Corporation (CSIC).

== Yuan Wang 6 ==
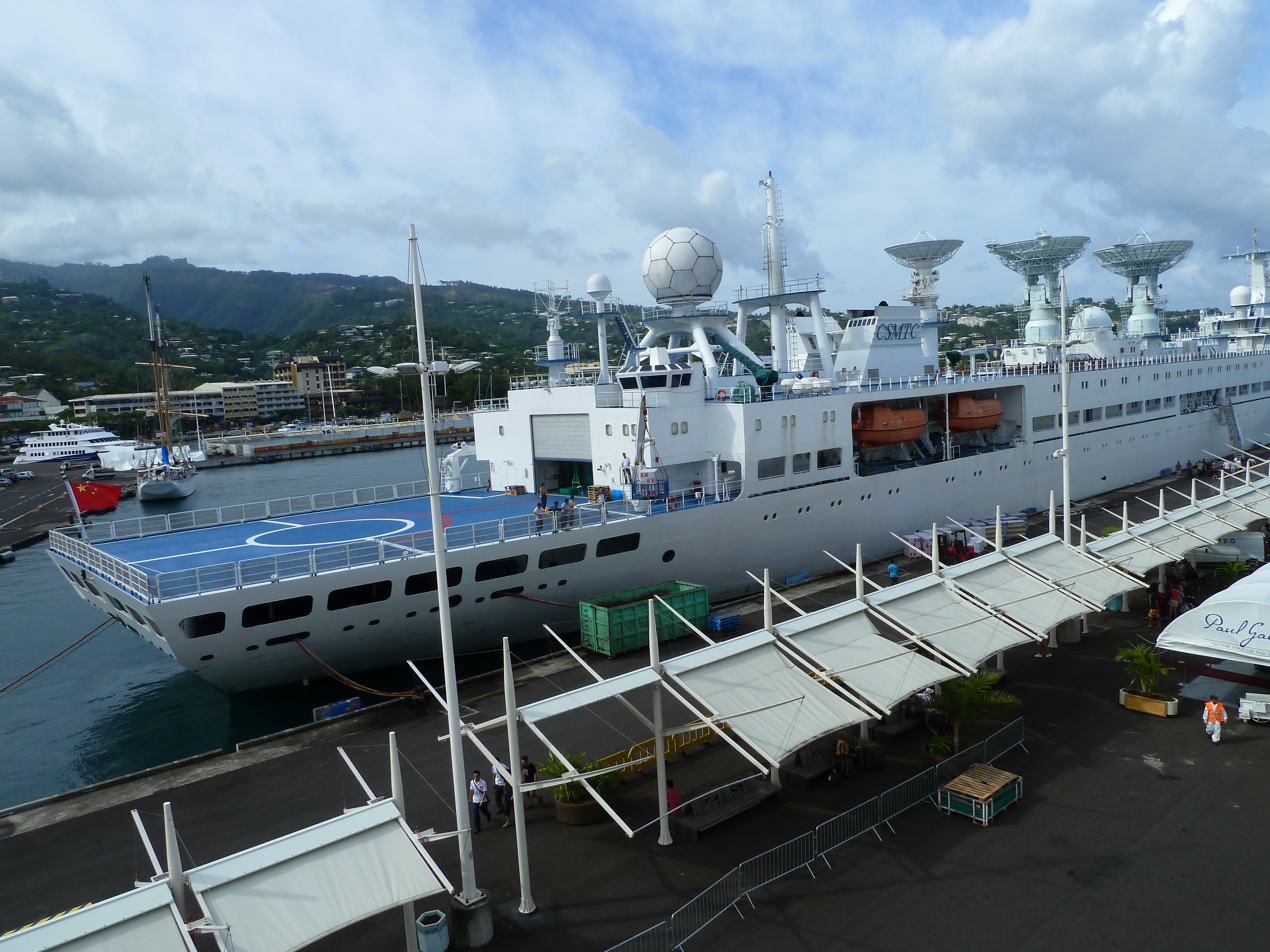
Yuan Wang 6 in port at Papeete.

Yuan Wang 6, like its sister ship Yuan Wang 5, is also a third generation tracking ship of Yuan Wang series. Designed by the 708th Research Institute, construction begun in April 2006, and the ship was launched on March 16, 2007. The ship entered service on April 12, 2008, and become fully operational in July 2008. Yuan Wang 6 utilizes fiber optic for its information system on board, and the electricity generated by the ship is enough to supply a city of 300,000. Specification:

- Length (m): 222.2
- Width (m): 25.2
- Displacement (t): 24,966
- Accommodation: 400

== Yuan Wang 7 ==
China's Space Tracking Ship Yuanwang-7 Starts new mission in 2018

Yuan Wang 7 was constructed by Jiangnan Shipbuilding, and is said to be able to operate for 100 days at sea. The China Satellite Maritime Tracking and Control Department has said the vessel will be used for maritime tracking of the Shenzhou 11 crewed space mission, and the Tiangong 2 space laboratory, using three large dish antennae some 10–12 meters in diameter. It was commissioned on 19 July 2016.

- Length (m): 220
- Width (m): tbc
- Height (m): 40m
- Displacement (t): 25,000

== Yuan Wang 8 (Liaowang 1) ==
By November 21, 2023, the Center for Strategic and International Studies had reported a new keel for a 30,000-ton Yuan Wang ship had been laid in the Jiangnan Shipyard. In 2025, multiple sources reported its commissioning as the People's Liberation Army Navy's first advanced missile tracking and command ship for themselves, built by China State Shipbuilding Corporation and featuring at least five 16-m-wide radomes and the fleet's most advanced electronic warfare suite. The ship was reported to have been present in the Gulf of Paria in autumn of that year as a show of support to Venezuela, and in the Gulf of Oman the next year, both to monitor the United States' missile movements.

- Length (m): 224
- Width (m): 32
- Height (m): TBD
- Displacement (t): Between 25,000 and 30,000

== Yuan Wang 21 ==
The Yuan Wang 21 is a cargo ship designed by the 708th Research Institute specially to transport rockets such as the Long March 5; construction began on 1 April 2012, and it was launched on 29 November 2012. Yuan Wang 21 entered service on 6 May 2013. Specification:

- Length (m): 130
- Width (m): 19
- Draft (m): 5.8
- Displacement (t): 9080

== Yuan Wang 22 ==
Yuan Wang 22 is also a cargo ship designed specially to transport rockets such as Long March 5, and it is also built by Jiangnan Shipyard, the same builder of earlier Yuan Wang 21. Yuan Wang 22 might be a sister ship of Yuan Wang 21, but this cannot be confirmed yet, because detailed information / specification of Yuan Wang 22 has not been released by official Chinese governmental sources yet (as of 2014). Yuan Wang 22 was launched on 24 January 2013.

== See also ==
A list of similar ships:

=== French Navy ===
- Monge, 1990–present

=== Indian Navy ===
- INS Dhruv, 2020–present, equipped with long range AESA tracking radars
- INS Anvesh, 2022–present, equipped with long range AESA tracking radars

=== Soviet Navy / Russian Navy ===
- Kosmonavt Vladimir Komarov, 1967–1989
- Akademik Sergei Korolev, 1970–1996
- Kosmonavt Yuri Gagarin, 1971–1991

=== United States Navy ===
- USNS Range Tracker (T-AGM-1) 1961-1969
- USNS Range Recoverer (T-AGM-2) 1960-1972
- USNS Longview (T-AGM-3) 1960-?
- USNS Richfield (T-AGM-4) 1960-1968
- USNS Sunnyvale (T-AGM-5) 1960-1974
- USNS Watertown (T-AGM-6) 1960-1971
- USNS Huntsville (T-AGM-7) 1960-1974
- USNS Wheeling (T-AGM-8) 1962-1990
- USNS General H. H. Arnold (T-AGM-9)
- USNS General Hoyt S. Vandenberg (T-AGM-10) 1964-1999
- USNS Twin Falls (T-AGM-11) 1960-1969
- USNS American Mariner (T-AGM-12) 1959-1964
- USNS Sword Knot (T-AGM-13) 1964-1972?
- USNS Rose Knot (T-AGM-14) 1964-1969
- USNS Coastal Sentry (T-AGM-15)
- USNS Coastal Crusader (T-AGM-16) 1964-1977
- USNS Timber Hitch (T-AGM-17) 1967-1979
- USNS Sampan Hitch (T-AGM-18) 1964-1973
- USNS Vanguard (T-AGM-19)
- USNS Redstone (T-AGM-20) 1964-1993
- USNS Mercury (T‑AGM‑21) 1964-1974?
- USNS Range Sentinel (T-AGM-22)
- USNS Observation Island (T-AGM-23) 1977–2014
- USNS Invincible (T-AGM-24) 2000–present, equipped with long range AESA tracking radars
- USNS Howard O. Lorenzen (T-AGM-25) 2014-present, equipped with long range AESA tracking radars
