= Military Unit Number =

Numeric designation for military and paramilitary units of post-Soviet states

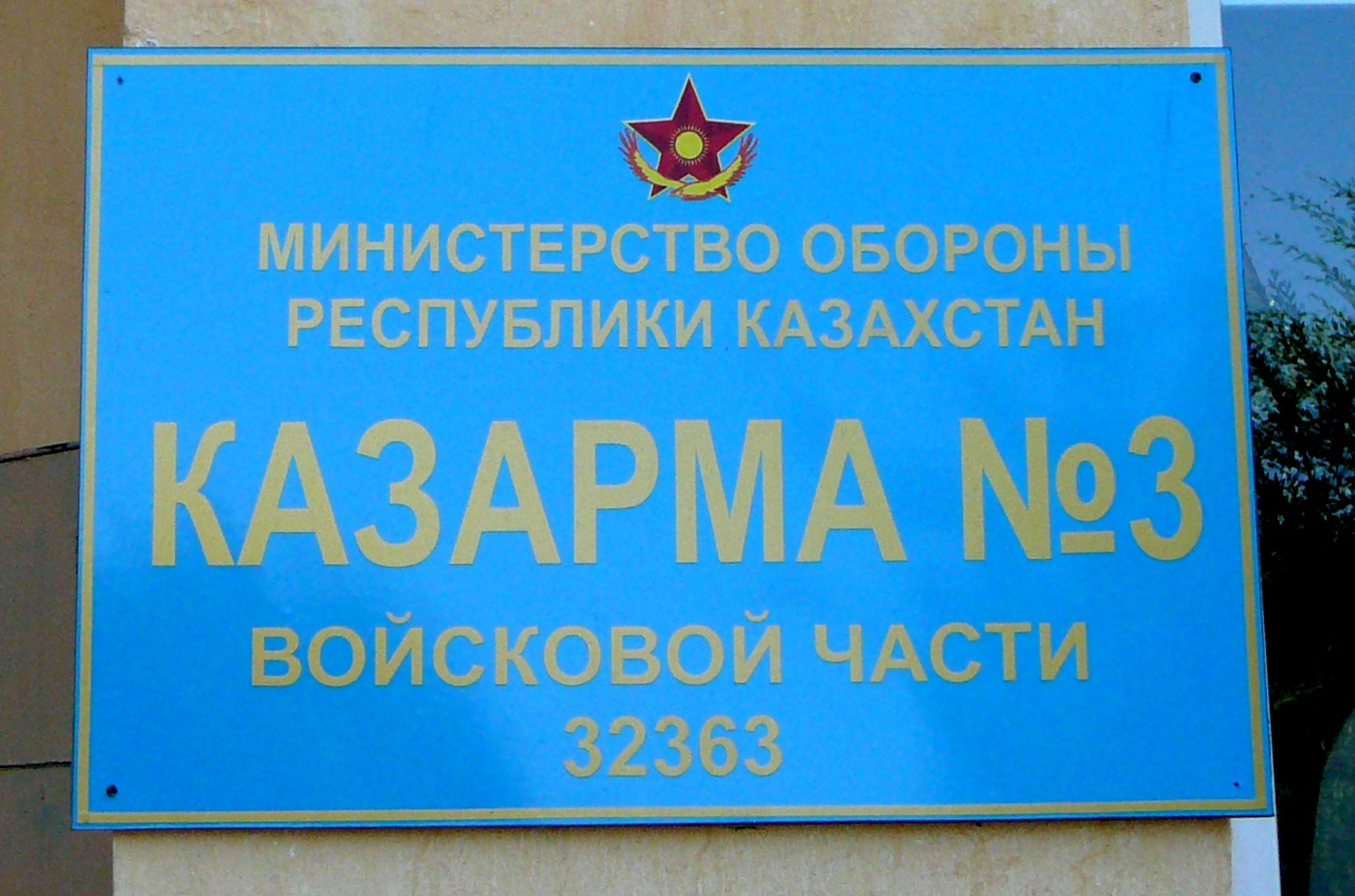
A sign on the barracks of the 35th Guards Air Assault Brigade of the Kazakh Air Assault Forces, indicating its Military Unit Number 32363.

A Military Unit Number (Russian: войсковая часть, в/ ч; Ukrainian: військова частина, в/ ч) is a unique numeric code assigned to military units of the Soviet Union and some Post-Soviet states. It is usually a four or five digit code for the purpose of identifying units of the armed forces and internal troops.

Military Unit Numbers for ground forces are assigned for a specific military unit (corps, division, brigade, etc.) while for the navy it is assigned to an individual ship. The number is also used for the unit's military mail and other logistics.

== Military Unit Number standards for post-Soviet states ==
Country	Forces type	Code rules	Example
Russia	Armed Forces	5 digits	28376
Ukraine	Armed Forces	1 Cyrillic letter and 4 digits	А0104
Ukraine	National Guard	4 digits	2837
Belarus	Armed Forces	5 digits	37615
Belarus	Internal Troops	4 digits	2837
Kazakhstan	Armed Forces	5 digits	32363
Kazakhstan	National Guard	4 digits	6506
Tajikistan	Armed Forces	5 digits	08050
Tajikistan	Internal Troops	4 digits	6506
Uzbekistan	Armed Forces	5 digits	08050
Uzbekistan	National Guard	4 digits	6506

== See also ==
- Military unit cover designator
- Unit Identification Code
