= CipherTrust =

CipherTrust was an anti-spam email software company based in Alpharetta, a suburb of Atlanta, Georgia, with offices around the world. It was cofounded by Jay Chaudhry and Lawrence Hughes (both formerly with SecureIT). Since August 2006 it is part of the Secure Computing Corporation, which was acquired by McAfee in 2008.

== Products ==
CipherTrust's main product is the IronMail, a gateway appliance that prevents leaks from uploading HTTP or FTP transfers through e-mail applications. It added a product to secure Instant Messaging called IronIM. The CTO, Paul Judge, chaired the Anti-Spam Research Group of the Internet Research Task Force. The firm also tracks zombie computers, a primary source of spam.

CipherTrust invented the TrustedSource reputation system that provides reputation scores for Internet identities, such as IP addresses, URLs, domains and email/web content. This became part of all its products and a main reason for its eventual buyout.

== Buyout ==
In July 2006, Secure Computing Corporation announced an agreement to acquire CipherTrust for a total consideration of US$273.6 million. The announced terms comprised US$185 million in cash, 10 million shares of Secure Computing common stock, and a US$10 million seller note, subject to certain performance obligations.

Secure Computing completed the acquisition on 31 August 2006.
