= Unit Identification Code =

Alphanumeric code used by the United States Department of Defense

The Unit Identification Code (UIC) is a six character alphanumeric code that uniquely identifies each United States Department of Defense entity. The UIC is often used on various paperwork to assign a soldier to a specific company in which they fall under.

The first character is the Service Designator:

- A: US Department of Agriculture
- B: US Department of Labor
- C: US Department of Commerce
- D: US Department of Defense
- E: US Coast Guard
- F: US Air Force
- G: US Department of Transportation
- H: US Department of Health and Human Services and US Department of Education
- J: US Judicial Branch
- K: US Department of Interior
- L: US Legislative Branch
- M: US Marine Corps
- N: US Navy
- P: US Postal Service
- Q: US Department of Justice
- R: Independent US Federal agency
- S: US Department of State
- T: US Treasury Department
- U: US Department of Housing and Urban Development
- V: Other independent US Federal agency
- W: US Army
- X: US Executive Branch (Office of the President)
- Y: State governments
- Z: International organizations and foreign governments

The next three characters indicate the Parent Unit Designator. These vary from branch to branch and provide information about the type of unit. For example, in the US Army, the parent unit designation breaks down as such:

Type: Army organization	Second position of the UIC
TOE units	Alphabetic
Active Component units	A–L (less I)
Army Prepositioned Stocks	M
Multiple component units	N
ARNG and USAR units	Q through Z
Table of Distribution and Allowances units	Numeric
Active Component units	0–6 (less 5)
ARNG and USAR units	7–9
Mobilization TDA(s) (currently under review)	5

The final two characters indicate the Descriptive Designator. They describe the specifics characteristics of the unit. For example, the parent Battalion unit for the Army will use "AA." A child Company unit, such as A Company, will use "A0."

The UIC is also used by commanding officers to identify their unit to a higher military unit, where the specific information of the unit can easily be researched and information can be accessed. It remains unclear as to the origins of UIC's, but they are assigned to all military units and organizations, as well as federal government organizations.

== See also ==
- Military Unit Number
