= Secure Computing Corporation =

American computer security software company

- Type: Division
- Industry: Security software and services
- Founded: 1984; 42 years ago (as Secure Computing Technology Center); Minneapolis, Minnesota, U.S. (spun off from Honeywell)
- Fate: Acquired by McAfee
- Headquarters: San Jose, California, U.S.
- Key people: Dan Ryan (president and CEO); Richard Scott (chairman)
- Products: Security appliances and hosted services
- Revenue: $237.9 million USD (2007)
- Number of employees: ~1000 (2007)
- Parent: McAfee
- Website: www.securecomputing.com

Secure Computing Corporation (SCC) was a public company that developed and sold computer security appliances and hosted services to protect users and data. McAfee acquired the company in 2008.

The company also developed filtering systems used by governments such as Iran and Saudi Arabia that blocks their citizens from accessing information on the Internet.

== Company history ==
In 1984, a research group called the Secure Computing Technology Center (SCTC) was formed at Honeywell in Minneapolis, Minnesota. The centerpiece of SCTC was its work on security-evaluated operating systems for the NSA. This work included the Secure Ada Target (SAT) and the Logical Coprocessing Kernel (LOCK), both designed to meet the stringent A1 level of the Trusted Computer Systems Evaluation Criteria (TCSEC).

Over the next several years, Secure Computing morphed from a small defense contractor into a commercial product vendor, largely because the investment community was much less interested in purchasing security goods from defense contractors than from commercial product vendors, especially vendors in the growing Internet space.

Secure Computing became a publicly traded company in 1995. Following the pattern of other Internet-related startups, the stock price tripled its first day: it opened at $16 a share and closed at $48. The price peaked around $64 in the next several weeks and then collapsed over the following year or so. It ranged between roughly $3 and $20 afterward until the company was purchased by McAfee.

The company headquarters were moved to San Jose, California, in 1998, though the bulk of the workforce remained in the Twin Cities. The Roseville employees completed a move to St. Paul, Minnesota, in February 2006. Several other sites now exist, largely the result of mergers.

=== Mergers and acquisitions ===
Secure Computing consisted of several merged units, one of the oldest being Enigma Logic, Inc., which was started around 1982. Bob Bosen, the founder, claims to have created the first security token to provide challenge–response authentication. Bosen published a computer game for the TRS-80 home computer in 1979, called 80 Space Raiders, that used a simple challenge–response mechanism for copy protection. People who used the mechanism encouraged him to repackage it for remote authentication. Bosen started Enigma Logic to do so, and filed for patents in 1982–83; a patent was issued in the United Kingdom in 1986. Ultimately, the "challenge" portion of the challenge–response was eliminated to produce a one-time password token similar to the SecurID product. Enigma Logic merged with Secure Computing Corporation in 1996.

Secure Computing acquired the SmartFilter product line by purchasing Webster Network Strategies, the producer of the WebTrack product, in 1996. The acquisition included the domain name webster.com, which was eventually sold to the publishers of Webster's Dictionary.

Shortly after acquiring the Webster/SmartFilter product, Secure Computing merged with Border Network Technologies, a Canadian company selling the Borderware firewall. Border Network Technologies boasted an excellent product and a highly developed set of sales channels; some said that the sales channels were a major inducement for the merger. Although the plan was to completely merge the Borderware product with Sidewinder, and to offer a single product to existing users of both products, this never quite succeeded. In 1998, the Borderware business unit was sold to a new company, Borderware Technologies Inc., formed by one of the original Borderware founders.

By this time, the mergers had yielded a highly distributed company with offices in Minnesota, Florida, California, and two or three in Ontario. This proved unwieldy, and the company scaled back to offices in Minnesota and California.

In 2002, the company took over the Gauntlet Firewall product from Network Associates.

In 2003, Secure Computing acquired N2H2, the makers of the Bess web filtering package. There has been some consolidation of Bess and SmartFilter, and Bess is now referred to as "Smartfilter, Bess edition" in company literature.

An acquisition of CyberGuard was announced in August 2005 and approved in January 2006. (A year earlier, CyberGuard had attempted to acquire Secure Computing, but the proposal had been rejected). This was the largest merger by Secure Computing at the time and resulted in the addition of several product lines, including three classes of firewalls, content and protocol filtering systems, and an enterprise-wide management system for controlling all of those products. Several offices were also added, including CyberGuard's main facility in Deerfield Beach, Florida, as well as the Webwasher development office in Paderborn, Germany, and a SnapGear development office in Brisbane, Australia.

In 2006, the company merged with Atlanta-based CipherTrust, a developer of email security solutions. The merger was announced in July 2006 and completed in August 2006.

On July 30, 2008, Secure Computing announced its intention to sell the SafeWord authentication product line to Aladdin Knowledge Systems, leaving the company with a business focused on web/mail security and firewalls. The sale was concluded later that year.

On September 22, 2008, McAfee announced its intention to acquire Secure Computing. The acquisition was completed not long afterwards, and the combined company formed the world's largest dedicated security company at the time.

== Products ==
=== TrustedSource reputation system ===
TrustedSource, a reputation system that Secure Computing obtained as part of the CipherTrust acquisition, was a key technology for the company, enabling all product lines with global intelligence capability based on behavioral analysis of traffic patterns from all of company's email, web and firewall devices and hosted services, as well as those of numerous OEM partners. TrustedSource derived real-time reputation scores of IPs, URLs, domains, and mail/web content based on a variety of data mining/analysis techniques, such as Support Vector Machine, Random forest, and Term-Frequency Inverse-Document Frequency (TFIDF) classifiers.

=== Web security ===
The company's flagship web security product line was the Secure Web appliance (formerly known as Webwasher). It provided Anti-Malware protection, TrustedSource reputation-enabled URL filtering controls, content caching, and SSL scanning capabilities.

In June 2008, Secure Computing launched Secure Web Protection Service, an in-the-cloud hosted web security service that provided a similar set of features to the Secure Web appliance, without requiring any on-premises equipment or software.

=== Mail security ===
The company's flagship email security product line was the Secure Mail appliance (formerly known as IronMail). It provided TrustedSource reputation-enabled anti-spam, data-leakage protection (DLP), encryption and anti-malware capabilities.

=== Secure firewalls ===
The company's flagship firewall product, formerly known as Sidewinder, was renamed McAfee Firewall Enterprise; McAfee sold Sidewinder to Forcepoint in January 2016. Over the years, Secure Computing (and its antecedent organizations) has offered the following major lines of firewall products:

- Firewall Enterprise (Sidewinder) – historically based on SecureOS, the company's derivative of BSDi (previously BSD/OS), but later based on FreeBSD.
- Secure Firewall Reporter
- Secure Firewall CommandCenter
- CyberGuard
  - Secure SnapGear – embedded system based on μClinux
  - Classic – built on UnixWare
  - TSP (Total Stream Protection) – built on Linux
- Borderware – sold off, as noted previously
- SecureZone – discontinued
- Firewall for NT – discontinued
- Gauntlet – built on Solaris, nearly phased out

The Sidewinder firewall incorporated technical features of the high-assurance LOCK system, including Type enforcement, a technology later applied in SELinux. However, interaction between Secure Computing and the open source community was spotty due to the company's ownership of patents related to Type enforcement. The Sidewinder never really tried to achieve an A1 TCSEC rating, but it did earn an EAL-4+ Common Criteria rating.

Along with Sidewinder, Gauntlet had been one of the earliest application layer firewalls; both had developed a large customer base in the United States Department of Defense. Gauntlet was originally developed by Trusted Information Systems (TIS) as a commercial version of the TIS Firewall Toolkit, an early open source firewall package developed under a DARPA contract.

== Use of company products for governmental censorship ==
The OpenNet Initiative studied filtering software used by governments to block access by their citizens and found Secure Computing's SmartFilter program heavily used by both the Iranian and Saudi governments. According to Secure Computing, any use of its software in Iran is without its consent—U.S. sanctions prohibit American companies from any dealings with Iran—and in 2005 the company said it is actively working to stop its illegal use.

In response to the company, Jonathan Zittrain, co-director of Harvard Law School's Berkman Center for Internet and Society, stated, "[T]he fact remains that the software has been in use for an extended period of time there. And we've seen Secure Computing software turn up in more than just Iran. We've seen it in Saudi Arabia as well."

In 2001 The New York Times reported that Secure Computing was one of ten companies competing for the Saudi government's contract for software to block its citizens' access to websites it deemed offensive. The company already had a deal with the Saudis that was due to expire in 2003. In its defense, Secure Computing has always stated that it cannot control how customers use a product once it has been sold. According to the OpenNet Initiative's 2007 report, the Saudi government's censorship "most extensively covers religious and social content, though sites relating to opposition groups and regional political and human rights issues are also targeted."

The governments of the United Arab Emirates, Oman, Sudan, and Tunisia also actively use SmartFilter. The Tunisian government goes so far as to redirect blocked pages to a fake Error 404 page, to hide the fact that blocking software is being used. The Tunisian Government is generally recognized as having a poor record when it comes to the right of free expression.

== See also ==
- Forcepoint
