= TrustedSource =

Internet reputation system

McAfee TrustedSource
- Developer: McAfee
- Website: www.trustedsource.org

TrustedSource is an Internet reputation system originally developed by CipherTrust and now owned by Intel Security. It provides reputation scores for Internet entities such as IP addresses, URLs, domains, and email.

TrustedSource works by analyzing traffic patterns from email, web and network data flows with data mining and analysis techniques, such as Support Vector Machine, Random forest, and Term-Frequency Inverse-Document Frequency (TFIDF) classifiers to determine the degree of maliciousness and security risk associated with each Internet identity, as well as perform content categorization. These are combined with local filters to either block or allow content.

Internet reputation systems like TrustedSource have been used to block network-based attacks sent over email, web and other protocols.
