= Military unit cover designator =

Chinese military unit identifier

A military unit cover designator (MUCD, MUCK-dee, Chinese: 部队代号; pinyin: bùduì dàihào) is a unique five-digit number used by the People's Liberation Army of the People's Republic of China to externally identify military units. MUCDs are used externally to protect the identity of units, while a true unit designator (TUD, Chinese: 部队番号; pinyin: bùduì fānhào) is used internally as they plainly identify the unit and its function.

An example, a bomber aircraft regiment in the People's Liberation Army Air Force (PLAAF) 8th Air Division may be known by its TUD, '22nd Air Regiment', or by its MUCD, 'Unit 95183'. The unit's TUD is used by members of the regiment, in common discourse, and among defense analysts, while the MUCD is used on stationery letterheads, newspapers, banners, magazine articles, and signs at the entrance to military facilities.

Some units, namely those conducting sensitive and secretive operations like those of the Third Department (Operations) of the Joint Staff Department, may only be known by their MUCD as their TUD has not been discovered. Popular examples include Unit 61398 and Unit 61486.

== History ==
First seeing use in the early 1950s, the MUCD system has been changed at least five times since the early 1950s with the most recent change in 2016.

Begun shortly after the 1949 communist victory in the Chinese Civil War, MUCDs were originally four-digit numbers until 1975 when, as part of Deng Xiaoping's counter-Maoist military reforms, the five-digit system presently used was introduced. Changing under further military reforms in 1987, the PLA saw the reconsolidation of eleven military regions down to seven. MUCD changed again in 2000 and once more in 2016 following the massive reorganization of the PLA under Xi Jinping that included the transition from military regions to theater commands, the Second Artillery Corps to the People's Liberation Army Rocket Force (PLARF), and the establishment of the Strategic Support Force (PLASSF) which incorporated various functional units of the General Staff Department (which became the Joint Staff Department).

== Blocks ==
While blocks of MUCDs are apportioned to commands, those commands decide how MUCDs are internally assigned without regulation from the Central Military Commission leading to variance in numbering patterns below the command.

Organization	1975–1985	1985–2000	2000–2016	2016–present
Joint staff Department (General staff Department)	57XXX, 58XXX, 88XXX		61XXX	
General Logistics Department	59XXX		62XXX	Disbanded
General Armament Department	89XXX		63XXX	Disbanded
People's Liberation Army Air Force	39XXX (aviation), 86XXX, 87XXX		93XXX, 94XXX, 95XXX	
People's Liberation Army Navy	37XXX, 38XXX		91XXX, 92XXX	
People's Liberation Army Rocket Force (Second Artillery Corps)	80XXX		96XXX	
People's Liberation Army Strategic Support Force	Not established			320XX–320XX
Nanjing Military Region	83XXX	32XXX, 83XXX	73XXX	Unknown (Eastern Theater Command)
Fuzhou Military Region	32XXX	Nanjing Military Region		Unknown (Eastern Theater Command)
Guangzhou Military Region	53XXX, 54XXX	34XXX, 53XXX, 54XXX	75XXX, 76XXX	Unknown (Southern Theater Command)
Wuhan Military Region	33XXX, 34XXX	Guangzhou Military Region		Unknown (Southern Theater Command)
Chengdu Military Region	356XX–359XX	35XXX, 56XXX	77XXX, 78XXX	Unknown (Western Theater Command)
Kunming Military Region	351XX–355XX	Chengdu Military Region		Unknown (Western Theater Command)
Lanzhou Military Region	36XXX, 84XXX		68XXX, 69XXX	Unknown (Western Theater Command)
Shenyang Military Region	81XXX, 82XXX		65XXX	Unknown (Northern Theater Command)
Beijing Military Region	32XXX, 83XXX		66XXX	Unknown (Central Theater Command)
Jinan Military Region	546XX, 55XXX		71XXX, 72XXX	Unknown (Northern, Central Theater Commands)
Sources: The PLA as an Organization v2.0, China's Strategic Support Force: A Force for a New Era

== See also ==
- Unit Identification Code (UIC), United States
- Military Unit Number, USSR and post-Soviet states
- Tsūshōgō, Imperial Japanese Army
