= Chinese espionage in the United States =

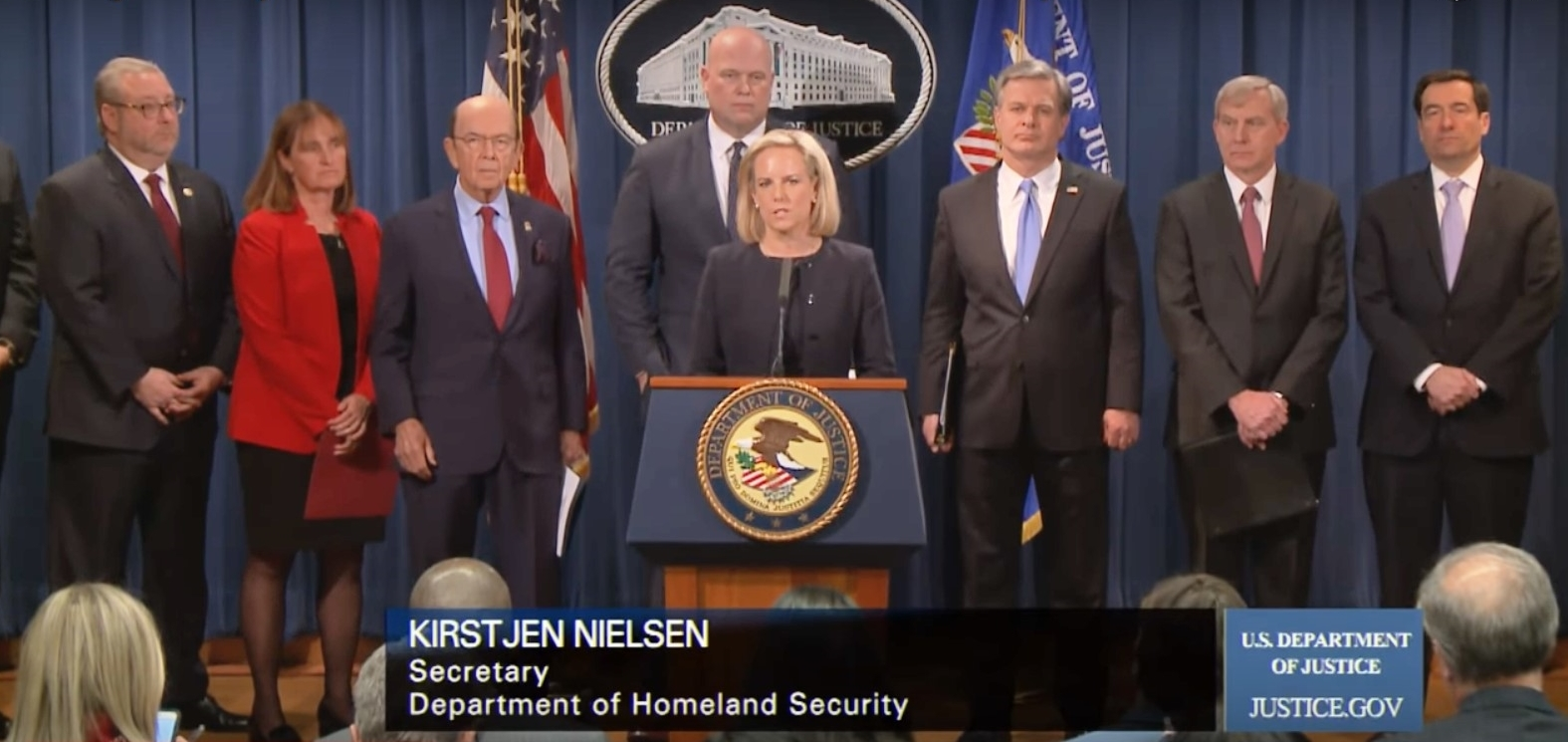
US Department of Justice among others announced 23 criminal charges (Financial Fraud, Money Laundering, Conspiracy to Defraud the United States, Theft of Trade Secret Technology and Sanctions Violations, etc.) against Huawei and its CFO Wanzhou Meng.

The United States has often accused the People's Republic of China (PRC) of unlawfully acquiring US military technology, classified information, personnel data, and trade secrets of US companies in order to support China's long-term military and commercial development. Alleged perpetrators include Chinese government agencies, affiliated personnel, civilian-in-name companies and their network of academic or business contacts.

Individuals convicted of traditional espionage include Larry Wu-tai Chin, Katrina Leung, Gwo-Bao Min, Chi Mak, Peter Lee, and Shujun Wang. The PRC also uses cyber espionage to penetrate the computer networks of U.S. businesses and government agencies. Notable examples include the 2009 Operation Aurora and the 2015 Office of Personnel Management data breach. Units of the People's Liberation Army have also been implicated in a number of cyber intrusions.

US law enforcement officials have identified China as the most active foreign power involved in the illegal acquisition of American technology. According to the Center for Strategic and International Studies, from 2000 to 2023, there were 224 reported instances of Chinese spying in the United States.

During its martial law period (1949–1987), the Republic of China government on Taiwan spied on its citizens abroad, especially in the United States.

== Methods ==
=== Human intelligence collection ===
China has used a variety of methods to gather intelligence in the United States. Individuals attempt to obtain targeted information from open sources such as libraries, research institutions and unclassified databases. Chinese travelers are recruited to carry out specific intelligence activities while individuals returning from exchange programs, trade missions and scientific-cooperation programs are debriefed for intelligence. Chinese citizens may be coerced into cooperating. China has recruited both Chinese and US citizens in the past. Motivations for the recruited include finances, conviction in the cause, extortion, and ego.

=== Technology transfer through commerce ===
Much technology acquisition occurs through commerce and commercial regulations. The regulatory and commercial environment in China pressures American and other foreign companies to transfer technology, capital and manufacturing expertise, especially in defense-related or dual-use industries such as computers, to their Chinese partners as part of doing business in China's huge, lucrative markets. Chinese agents purchase high-tech equipment through front organizations in Hong Kong. China also uses state-run firms to purchase American companies with access to the targeted technology.

=== Industrial espionage ===
China also accesses foreign technology through industrial espionage, with United States Immigration and Customs Enforcement rating China's industrial-espionage and theft operations as the leading threat to US technological security. In 2021, acting NCSC Director Michael Orlando estimated that China stole between $200 billion and $600 billion worth of American intellectual property every year. Between October 2002 and January 2003, five Chinese businessmen were accused of illegally shipping equipment and trade secrets from California to China, and US officials prevented a Chinese man from shipping a new, high-speed computer used in classified projects (including nuclear-weapons development) from Sandia National Laboratories.

=== Use of Artificial Intelligence ===
AI models like DeepSeek have been employed by State-affiliated cybergroups like Grimfengxi that used the tool for creating exploit codes, Huapi that targeted an email system of a Taiwanese company, and Teleboyi that allegedly used the platform to "collect 1,000 IP addresses" from the internet and map a company's domains. According to the US Justice Department, activity linked to one of these groups overlaps with operations attributed to Mustang Panda, another group that is backed by the Chinese government.

However, Chinese hackers have also used American AI for such activities. According to the cybersecurity firm CyCraft, ChatGPT has been used during an attack on a Western think-tank. A group known as Slime22 managed to use Anthropic's Claude Code to infiltrate the systems of a Taiwanese technology company before.

=== FBI counterintelligence assessments ===
In July 2020, FBI Director Christopher Wray called China the "greatest long-term threat" to the United States. He said that "the FBI is now opening a new China-related counterintelligence case every 10 hours. Of the nearly 5,000 active counterintelligence cases currently underway across the country, almost half are related to China."

=== Targeting of US officials ===
US Representative Eric Swalwell, who served on the House Permanent Select Committee on Intelligence, was in the past targeted by a Chinese woman believed to be a clandestine officer of China's Ministry of State Security. The alleged Chinese spy later participated in fundraising for Swalwell's 2014 congressional election bid and helped place an intern inside Swalwell's congressional office. The FBI gave Swalwell a "defensive briefing" in 2015, informing him that the woman was a suspected Chinese agent.

In 2013, a Chinese driver was employed by Senator Dianne Feinstein who was notified that the driver was being investigated for possible Chinese spying. At some point, he visited China and was recruited by China's MSS. He worked for Senator Feinstein for several years. The FBI concluded the driver hadn't revealed anything of substance.

=== Operation Fox Hunt and pressure on dissidents ===
In 2015, the Obama administration protested to Beijing after discovering that Chinese agents, as part of Operation Fox Hunt, were tracking down Chinese dissidents in the United States to pressure them to return to China for prosecution.

In October 2020, FBI Director Christopher Wray said that "when it couldn't locate a Fox Hunt target, the Chinese government sent an emissary to visit the victim's family here in the United States. And the message they said to pass on? The target had two options: Return to China promptly or commit suicide. And what happens when Fox Hunt targets refuse to return to China? Their family members, both here in the United States and in China, have been threatened and coerced; and those back in China have even been arrested for leverage."

In July 2021, ProPublica reported that Operation Fox Hunt, nominally focused on economic crimes, was targeting "Tibetans, Hong Kongers, followers of the Falun Gong religious movement and, perhaps most visibly, the Uyghurs." ProPublica reported that a team of Communist Party operatives and police based in Wuhan had been roaming the United States pressuring Chinese immigrant communities, with the spies performing stalking in plain sight and hiring a US-based private investigator. For example, in a 2018 New Jersey court case, a former Chinese official living in the US was sued by the Wuhan-based Xinba Construction Group. The expatriate was harassed outside of court and received notes threatening his family. Later, he received a video from his family in China imploring him to return with a staged shot, implying the video was coerced by the Chinese government, according to investigators.

In 2017, MSS officials entered the United States on transit visas while posing as cultural officials. They met with dissident Guo Wengui to pressure him to return to China, but Guo recorded the conversations and alerted the FBI. The officials were later confronted by FBI agents and ordered to leave the country after admitting they were security officials. Before departing, they visited Guo a second time, but he again refused their offer. The FBI considered arresting the officials on charges including visa fraud and extortion, but the arrests were reportedly canceled to avoid a diplomatic crisis. The FBI did confiscate the officials’ phones before they left the United States.

=== MSS structure and geographic focus ===
The eighteenth bureau of the Ministry of State Security (MSS) is dedicated to espionage against the United States. According to Nicholas Eftimiades, PRC intelligence collection activities focus on educational, research, and manufacturing centers in states such as Massachusetts, Michigan, New York, Pennsylvania, Florida, New Jersey, and Texas.

=== Targeting of former federal employees and data brokers ===
A May 2025 study by researchers at the Foundation for Defense of Democracies found that a Chinese government-backed intelligence operation has been targeting laid-off US government employees through fake job websites such as LinkedIn and social media. Data broker companies are also targets.

== Nuclear espionage ==
Information is collected through espionage, reviews of US technical and academic publications and interaction with US scientists. China tasks a large number of individuals to collect small pieces of information (which are collated and analyzed), and individual agents can more easily escape suspicion. US government personnel suspect that China's intelligence-gathering efforts directed towards the development of modern nuclear weapons are focused on the Los Alamos National Laboratory (LANL), where nuclear weapons were first developed in the 1940s, Lawrence Livermore, Sandia and Oak Ridge National Laboratories. China is known to have stolen classified information on the W-56 Minuteman II ICBM, the W-62 Minuteman III ICBM, the W-70 Lance short-range ballistic missile (SRBM), the W-76 Trident C-4 submarine-launched ballistic missile (SLBM), the W-78 Minuteman III Mark 12A ICBM, the W-87 Peacekeeper ICBM and the W-88 Trident D-5 SLBM and weapon-design concepts and features.

In 2016, the US Justice Department charged China General Nuclear Power Group (CGN) with stealing nuclear secrets from the United States. The Guardian reported: "According to the US Department of Justice, the FBI has discovered evidence that China General Nuclear Power (CGN) has been engaged in a conspiracy to steal US nuclear secrets stretching back almost two decades. Both CGN and one of the corporation's senior advisers, Szuhsiung Ho, have been charged with conspiring to help the Chinese government develop nuclear material in a manner that is in clear breach of US law."

A 2022 report by Strider Technologies, a strategic intelligence firm, found that over the past two decades, China has recruited at least 154 Chinese scientists from LANL to support China's development of military technologies that pose threats to US national security.

=== 1999 Cox Report ===
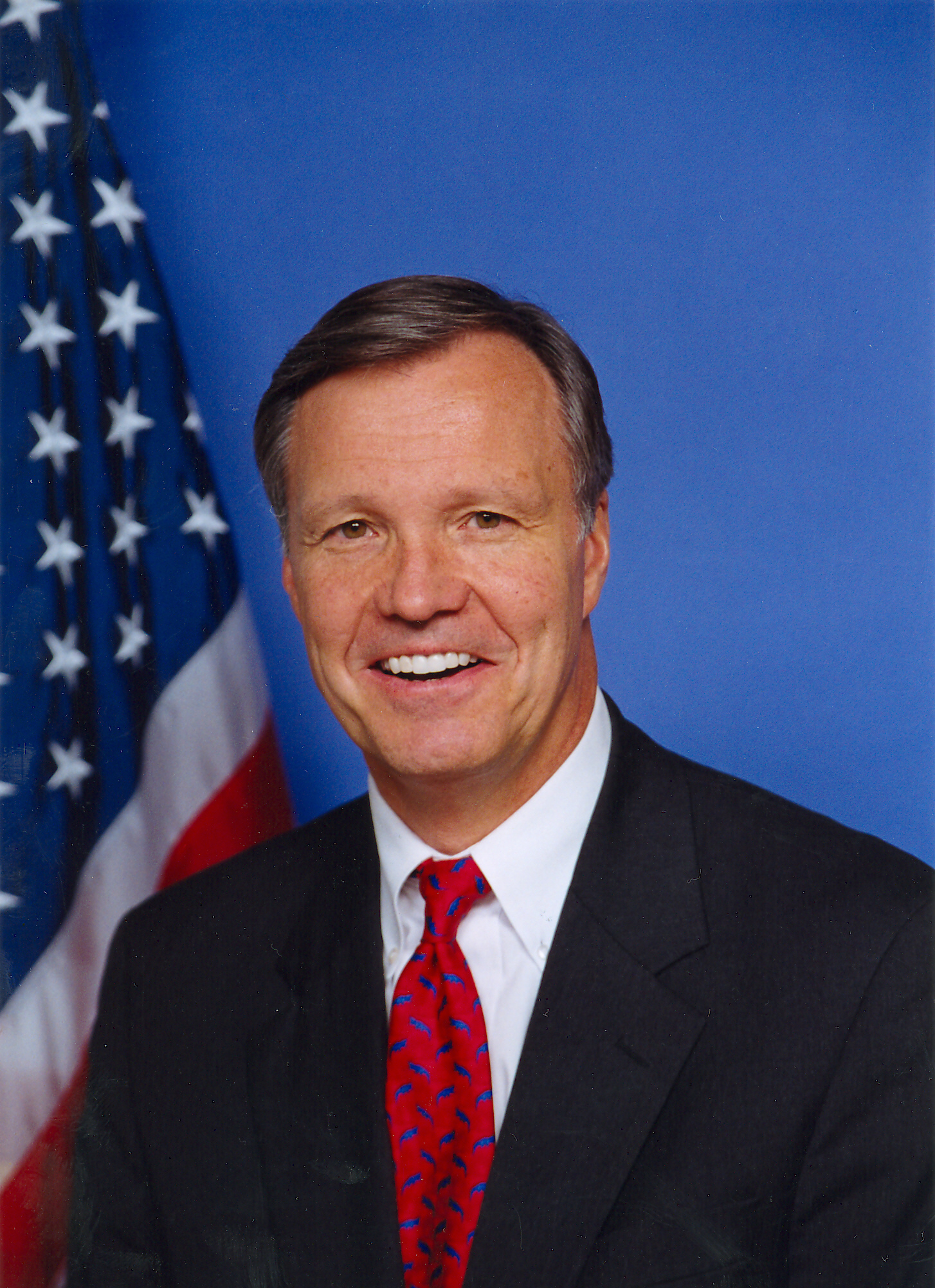
U.S. Representative Chris Cox (Republican-California) chaired the Committee that produced the report.

The Report of the Select Committee on U.S. National Security and Military/Commercial Concerns with the People's Republic of China, commonly known as the Cox Report after Representative Christopher Cox, is a classified U.S. government document reporting on the People's Republic of China's espionage operations within the United States during the 1980s and 1990s. The redacted version of the report was released to the public on May 25, 1999. The release of the redacted report was preceded by an intelligence community report which was more conservative in its allegations.

The Chinese government responded that the allegations were "groundless" and that it had already developed the necessary technologies prior to the alleged thefts. As part of its rebuttal, the Chinese government revealed that it had developed a neutron bomb in the 1980s.

Various academic critiques of the Cox Report exist. A group of Stanford University scientists analyzed the report, concluding that it was inflammatory, groundless in some instances, and had some important relevant facts wrong. Other academic analyses have noted that the chronology of China's development of comparable warheads contributes to refuting the Cox Report allegations or that alleged stolen secrets were in fact fairly basic information.

== Cyberwarfare ==
China conducts political and corporate espionage to access the networks of financial, defense and technology companies and research institutions in the United States. Email attachments attempting to enter the networks of US companies and organizations exploit security weaknesses in software. A recipient opens an email attachment, apparently from a familiar source, containing a program which embeds in the recipient's computer. The remotely controlled program allows an attacker to access the recipient's email, send sensitive documents to specific addresses and turns on such instruments as web cameras or microphones.

The FBI stated that China operates the world's largest hacking program, surpassing all other foreign governments combined, making it difficult to keep pace with Beijing's intelligence-gathering efforts. In 2019, CNN reported that China had created an extensive infrastructure charged with cyber espionage over the past two decades. A previous FBI head of counterintelligence said that "the Chinese have tens of thousands of young kids—like our MIT's or Stanford's best—hacking against the US." Some hackers work full-time and others work part-time.

Just using cyber means, Chinese government hackers have stolen more of our personal and corporate data than every other nation combined. The harm from the Chinese government’s economic espionage isn't just that its companies pull ahead based on illegally gotten technology. While they pull ahead, they push our companies and workers behind. And that harm—company failures, job losses—has been building for a decade to the crush that we feel today. It’s harm felt across the country in a whole range of industries. — Director of the FBI Christopher Wray, Countering Threats Posed by the Chinese Government Inside the U.S., Remarks at Ronald Reagan Presidential Library and Museum, January 21, 2022)

In January 2010, Google reported "a highly sophisticated and targeted attack on our corporate infrastructure originating from China that resulted in the theft of intellectual property from Google." According to investigators, the Google cyber-attack targeted the Gmail accounts of Chinese human-rights activists. At least 34 other companies have been attacked, including Yahoo, Symantec, Adobe, Northrop Grumman and Dow Chemical.

In January 2013, The New York Times reported that it was the victim of hacking attempts originating from China during the previous four months after it published an article on Prime Minister Wen Jiabao. According to the newspaper, the "attacks appear to be part of a broader computer espionage campaign against American news media companies that have reported on Chinese leaders and corporations."

Chinese cyber-attacks seem to target strategic industries in which China lags; attacks on defense companies target weapons-systems information, and attacks on technology companies seek source code critical to software applications. Operation Aurora emphasized what senior U.S. government officials have called an increasingly serious cyber threat to critical industries.

On August 6, 2020, US President Donald Trump officially extended restrictions against Chinese-owned apps by signing two executive orders that would ban US residents from doing business with TikTok and WeChat, a popular messaging platform run by Tencent Holdings Ltd. The ban was enacted, citing the security risk of leaving Americans’ personal data exposed. However, on September 28, 2020, the ban was temporarily blocked by a federal judge.

In September 2022, it was reported during Congressional testimony that the FBI had informed Twitter of at least one MSS agent on its payroll.

In January 2024, US authorities stated that they disrupted an operation by the Chinese state's advanced persistent threat called Volt Typhoon to target US critical infrastructure.

In September 2024, Salt Typhoon, an advanced persistent threat (APT) affiliated with the MSS, was publicly reported to have gained access to multiple internet service providers in the U.S. and attempted to gain access to the phones of staff of the Kamala Harris 2024 presidential campaign as well as those of Donald Trump and JD Vance. The same month, Chinese state-sponsored hackers penetrated the National Institutes of Health.

In October 2024, The Washington Post reported that the US federal government formed a multi-agency team to address a 2024 hack of US telecommunications companies, conducted by Salt Typhoon, which affected systems that track federal wiretap requests.

In September 2025, Phantum Taurus was identified as a new China-backed group that engages in espionage attacks, targeting foreign governments and militaries across Asia, Africa, and the Middle East.

=== Cyber cases ===
In 2007, the computer security company McAfee alleged that China was actively involved in cyberwarfare, accusing the country of cyber-attacks on India, Germany and the United States; China denied knowledge of these attacks. In September 2007, former senior US information security official Paul Strassmann said that 735,598 computers in the US were "infested with Chinese zombies"; computers infected in this manner can theoretically form a botnet capable of carrying out unsophisticated yet potentially dangerous denial-of-service attacks. A cyber spying network known as GhostNet, using servers primarily based in China, was reported as tapping into the classified documents of government and private organizations in 103 countries (including Tibetan exiles); China denied the claim.

In a July 2021 joint statement with NATO, the EU, and other Western nations, the US accused the Ministry of State Security of perpetrating several cyberattacks, most notably the 2021 Microsoft Exchange Server data breach.

==== APT 1 ====
In December 2009 and January 2010, a cyberattack, known as Operation Aurora, was launched from China on Google and over 20 other companies. Google said that the attacks originated from China, and it would "review the feasibility" of its business operations in China as a result of the incident. According to Google, at least 20 other companies in a variety of sectors were also targeted by the attacks. According to McAfee, "this is the highest profile attack of its kind that we have seen in recent memory."

In May 2014, a US federal grand jury indicted five Chinese military officers for cyber espionage and stealing trade secrets. It was alleged that the officers hacked into the computers of six US companies to steal information that would provide an economic advantage to Chinese competitors, including Chinese state-owned enterprises. The Chinese government claimed that the charges were "made-up", and said that the indictment would damage trust between the two nations. Although the indictments have been called relatively meaningless, they could limit travel by the officers due to the US extradition treaties.

==== APT 3 ====
In November 2017, the Department of Justice charged three Chinese employees of Guangzhou Bo Yu Information Technology Company Limited with hacking into corporate entities in the United States, including Siemens AG, Moody's Analytics, and Trimble Inc.

==== APT 10 ====
Since at least 2013, a Chinese espionage group called TEMP.Periscope by FireEye is reported to have been engaged in espionage against maritime-related subjects. FireEye reported that the information targeted was likely of commercial and economic importance.

The People's Liberation Army (PLA) was tied to economic espionage involving stolen business plans, intellectual property, and infringed on private conversations from Westinghouse Electric and United States Steel Corporation.

Chinese hackers have stolen information on the Patriot missile system, the F-35 Joint Strike Fighter, and the US Navy's new littoral combat ship. These blueprints of US weapon and control systems were stolen to advance the development of Chinese weaponry.

The protection of the South China Sea is highly important to the US because a Chinese Cyber Unit has already succeeded in an intrusion into the Philippine's government and military networks. Military documents, internal communications, and other sensitive materials related to the dispute were lost due to the cyber invasion.

In January and February 2018, Chinese state cyber actors reportedly stole 614 gigabytes of data from a Naval Undersea Warfare Center-affiliated contractor. The compromised material reportedly included information on a project dubbed "Sea Dragon", as well as United States Navy submarine cryptographic systems and electronic warfare.

The New York Times reported that Russia and China are routinely eavesdropping on calls from an iPhone used by President Donald Trump, with China reportedly attempting to influence the President by identifying and influencing the people Trump is regularly in contact with.

According to the cybersecurity firm Area 1, hackers working for the People's Liberation Army Strategic Support Force compromised the networks of the AFL–CIO in order to gain information on negotiations for the Trans-Pacific Partnership.

As part of a campaign called Cloudhopper, hackers working for the Ministry of State Security compromised the networks of IBM and Hewlett Packard Enterprise, and used that access to compromise those companies' clients. The Cloudhopper attacks began no later than 2014, and included targets in Brazil, Germany, India, Japan, the United Arab Emirates, the United Kingdom, and the United States.

In 2018, the United States Department of Justice indicted two individuals of APT10, which it stated was under the direction of the Tianjin State Security Bureau (TSSB) of MSS.

In October 2018, Bloomberg Businessweek published a story which alleged that Supermicro's contractors in China had been compromised by the People's Liberation Army in an operation to implant microchips with hardware backdoors in its servers. The report was widely disputed by the sources and companies who were named therein.

In March 2019, iDefense reported that Chinese hackers had launched cyberattacks on dozens of academic institutions in an attempt to gain information on technology being developed for the United States Navy. Some of the targets included the University of Hawaii, the University of Washington, the Massachusetts Institute of Technology, and Woods Hole Oceanographic Institution. The attacks have been underway since at least April 2017.

==== APT 27 ====
In March 2025, the United States Department of Justice unsealed two indictments against Chinese nationals Yin Kecheng (尹可成), also known as "YKC" or "YIN," and Zhou Shuai (周帅), known as "Coldface" or "ZHOU," for their roles in a years-long cyber intrusion campaign attributed to the advanced persistent threat group APT27, also known as "Emissary Panda," "Bronze Union," and "Silk Typhoon." The indictments allege that the defendants conducted sophisticated computer intrusions targeting U.S.-based defense contractors, technology firms, government agencies, and other institutions for financial gain. Both individuals are said to have ties to the Chinese government, specifically the Ministry of Public Security (MPS) and the Ministry of State Security (MSS), which allegedly directed or supported the hackers' activities.

The criminal conduct spans from at least 2011 to 2024 and includes charges such as conspiracy, wire fraud, aggravated identity theft, money laundering, and violations of the Computer Fraud and Abuse Act (CFAA). According to U.S. authorities, Yin and Zhou gained unauthorized access to victim networks by exploiting vulnerabilities, installing persistent malware, and exfiltrating sensitive data. Zhou allegedly brokered stolen data and access to compromised networks to third parties, some of whom were connected to the PRC government or military. The scheme also involved the use of virtual private servers (VPS) and internet domains to mask operations and facilitate data theft.

As part of the enforcement action, the U.S. government seized a VPS account used by Zhou and multiple domains operated by Yin. These assets were reportedly used to support intrusions, including a breach of the U.S. Department of Treasury. The Department of Treasury imposed sanctions on Zhou and his affiliated company, Shanghai Heiying Information Technology Co., Ltd., and had previously sanctioned Yin for his role in the Treasury compromise. The Federal Bureau of Investigation, NCIS, and multiple private cybersecurity firms contributed to the investigation, and arrest warrants remain outstanding for both defendants, who are considered fugitives.

===== Significance =====
According to the indictment, Zhou Shuai had spent five years collecting data on border crossings, telecommunications, and individuals in the media, civil service, and religious sectors under directives from China's Ministry of State Security (MSS). The case highlights what U.S. officials describe as a growing "hacking-for-hire ecosystem" in China, where private firms such as i-Soon operate with implicit government backing, enabling Chinese state security services to maintain operational reach while preserving plausible deniability. Wu Haibo, founder of i-Soon and a former member of China's first hacktivist group, Green Army, is alleged to have overseen and coordinated many of these cyber operations.

==== APT 40 ====
Hafnium, a state-sponsored Chinese cyber espionage group which is allegedly connected to China's Ministry of State Security and considered to be one of the APT40 groups, was responsible for a series of high-profile cyber intrusions targeting sensitive research and organizations worldwide. Operating through front companies such as Shanghai Powerock Network Co. Ltd., this group allegedly orchestrated attacks under the direction of the Shanghai State Security Bureau. Notably, the group launched the "Hafnium" campaign, exploiting vulnerabilities in Microsoft Exchange Server software to compromise thousands of computers globally, including those of American universities, law firms, and entities involved in COVID-19 research. Their tactics included deploying web shells for persistent access and exfiltrating sensitive data, with targets ranging from biomedical research to government policy documents.

The Hafnium campaign, attributed to the APT40 group, exemplified the group's capacity for large-scale, indiscriminate cyberattacks, targeting over 60,000 U.S. entities and compromising more than 12,700 victims. The campaign underscored the persistent risks posed by state-sponsored hacking and the challenges of attribution and remediation in the global cybersecurity landscape.

===== Indictments =====
In July 2025, the United States Department of Justice unsealed a nine-count indictment in the Southern District of Texas against Xu Zewei and Zhang Yu, both Chinese nationals, for their roles in these intrusions. The charges included conspiracy to commit wire fraud, wire fraud, unauthorized access to protected computers, intentional damage to protected computers, and aggravated identity theft. Xu was arrested in Italy and faced extradition, while Zhang remained at large. The indictment highlighted use of a network of private contractors to obscure state involvement and maximize the scope of cyber-espionage operations.

==== APT 41 ====
In July 2024, Mandiant reported a major resurgence in malware attacks by APT 41, a notorious hacking group backed by the Chinese government. The group was found targeting organizations in the shipping, logistics, technology, and automotive industries across Europe and Asia.

In September 2020, the US Department of Justice (DOJ) had charged Chinese hackers Zhang Haoran, Tan Dailin, Jiang Lizhi, Qian Chuan, and Fu Qiang with breaching more than 100 companies, think tanks, universities and government agencies around the world. The DOJ linked them to APT 41 hacking activities.

=== QTFY Campaign ===
QTFY is referred to as a "state-sponsored group" by the FBI. The group has been accused of targeting the US government organisations like the Department of Energy, Department of Justice (DOJ), Department of Health and Human Services, and the National Institutes of Health. The group was active since 2018. Members include former members of the People's Liberation Army who, according to the DOJ, used their PLA relationships "to obtain contracts and subcontracts supporting offensive cyber operations." They were allegedly employed by the Nanjing Xinjiuwei Network Technology Company, which has been accused of conducting "malicious cyber activities" for the Chinese government.

In August 2019, QTFY failed in an attempt to break into NASA's server by exploiting a VPN vulnerability.

In September 2024, computer intrusions were attempted at three laboratories of the Department of Energy, the NIH, an HHS agency, and an unnamed US security device manufacturer.

In August 2026, the DOJ seized domains used by two hacking platforms, QScan and QTRouter, that are accused of being part of the group's campaign.

== Indictments ==
In 2010, the Shanghai State Security Bureau directed US citizen Glenn Duffie Shriver to apply for a position at the National Clandestine Service of the CIA. In 2017, SSSB case workers were implicated in the recruitment of US Department of State employee Candace Claiborne who was charged with obstruction of justice.

On May 19, 2014, the United States Department of Justice announced that a federal grand jury had indicted five People's Liberation Army officers for stealing confidential business information and intellectual property from U.S. commercial firms and planting malware on their computers.

During January 2017, the FBI arrested Candace Claiborne, a State Department employee who had previously worked in the American Embassy in Beijing between 2009 and 2012. In April 2019 Claiborne pleaded guilty to one count of conspiring to defraud the United States. Prosecutors argued that she had passed sensitive information to the MSS.

In early 2017, ex-CIA officer Kevin Mallory was having financial difficulties when he was contacted by a "headhunter" on LinkedIn, who turned out to be a Ministry of State Security operative. The operative set up a phone call with Mallory and another person, pretending it was a job with the Shanghai Academy of Social Sciences. After two visits to China, Mallory consented to selling defense secrets to his Chinese contacts.

In October 2018, the Deputy Minister of State Security, Yanjun Xu, was charged with economic espionage by the United States prosecutors.

In 2020, the United States Department of Justice indicted two MSS contractors who were involved in hacking Moderna, a biotechnology company developing a vaccine for the COVID-19 pandemic. In September 2020, the Cybersecurity and Infrastructure Security Agency released a security advisory regarding hacking by groups affiliated with the MSS.

On May 28, 2021, a federal grand jury in the United States District Court for the Southern District of California returned an indictment against four People's Republic of China (PRC) citizens for their alleged roles in a long running campaign of computer network operations targeting trade secrets, intellectual property, and other high value information from companies, universities, research institutes, and governmental entities in the United States and abroad, as well as multiple foreign governments. The indictment alleges that Zhu Yunmin, Wu Shurong, Ding Xiaoyang, and Cheng Qingmin targeted the following sectors: aerospace/aviation, biomedical, defense industrial base, healthcare, manufacturing, maritime, research institutes, transportation (rail and shipping), and virus research from 2012 to 2018, on behalf of the PRC Ministry of State Security. Additionally, the indictment alleges the use of front companies by the Ministry of State Security to conduct cyber espionage.

In July 2020, the United States Department of Justice charged two Chinese hackers who allegedly targeted intellectual property and confidential business information, including COVID-19 research. The two hackers allegedly worked with the Guangdong State Security Department of the Ministry of State Security.

In July 2020, Jun Wei Yeo, a Singapore national, pled guilty for acting within the U.S. as an illegal agent of China and using career networking sites such as LinkedIn to recruit Americans of interest to provide classified and sensitive information to the Chinese government. He was sentenced to 14 months in prison in October 2020.

In September 2020, Baimadajie Angwang, a New York City Police Officer of Tibetan descent, was arrested for allegedly gathering information on the Tibetan American community for the MSS. He was also accused of trying to recruit informants inside the local Tibetan community. In January 2023, federal prosecutors dismissed all charges against the officer.

In July 2021, the Justice Department credited four Chinese nationals (accused of working for the MSS) with a hacking campaign targeting government, academic, and private institutions; the individuals were each charged with one count of conspiracy to commit computer fraud and conspiracy to commit economic espionage.

In March 2022, the U.S. Department of Justice indicted individuals, including an MSS officer, for surveilling and conspiring to harass Chinese American pro-democracy dissidents, including political candidate Xiong Yan, Olympic figure skater Alysa Liu and her father Arthur Liu. In May 2022, the U.S. Department of Justice charged a US citizen for spying under the direction of the MSS on Hong Kong pro-democracy activists, Taiwan independence supporters, and Uyghur and Tibetan activists.

In 2023, Ashley Tellis, a former U.S. State Department consultant, was accused of removing classified documents and meeting Chinese officials. Authorities found over 1,000 secret pages at his home and cited meetings in September 2022 and April 2023 discussing sensitive topics.

In May 2026, Lu Jianwang was convicted in the US for acting as an unregistered Chinese agent after allegedly helping operate a covert "police station" in New York that targeted Chinese dissidents. In the same week, Arcadia mayor Eileen Wang pleaded guilty to spreading pro-China propaganda under direction from Chinese officials. Federal prosecutors alleged that between 2020 and 2022, Wang and co-conspirator Yaoning "Mike" Sun operated a Chinese-language community website that published pro-Beijing propaganda at the direction of Chinese government officials, including content denying allegations of genocide in Xinjiang.

On June 3, 2026, the Five Eyes countries-U.S., U.K., Canada, Australia, and New Zealand-warned that Chinese intelligence was targeting people with access to sensitive information through online job platforms. The alert said China aimed to gather military, political, and economic secrets, offering money in exchange for confidential data. Those at risk included government and military staff, journalists, and think tank workers. China denied the claims, calling them false and politically motivated.

In September 2026, former U.S. Army soldier Ruoyu Duan pleaded guilty to a count of conspiracy to gather and transmit national defense information concerning U.S. military systems, including the Bradley, Stryker, and HIMARS, to China.

== 2010–2012 compromise of CIA network ==
Between 2010 and 2012, intelligence breaches led to Chinese authorities dismantling CIA intelligence networks in the country, killing and arresting a large number of CIA assets within China. A joint CIA/FBI counterintelligence operation, codenamed "Honey Bear", was unable to definitively determine the source of the compromises, though theories include the existence of a mole, cyber-espionage, compromise of Hillary Clinton's illicit classified email server as noted by the intelligence community inspector general, or poor tradecraft. Mark Kelton, then the deputy director of the National Clandestine Service for Counterintelligence, was initially skeptical that a mole was to blame.

In January 2018, a former CIA officer named Jerry Chun Shing Lee (Note: Alternatively known as Zhen Cheng Li.) was arrested at John F. Kennedy International Airport, on suspicion of helping dismantle the CIA's network of informants in China. He was found guilty and sentenced to 19 years.

== Aerospace ==
In an effort to steal the technology to enable Chinese companies to supply the components for the Comac C919 aircraft, the Chinese engaged in both cyber and HUMINT operations. According to a report from cybersecurity firm Crowdstrike and a US Justice Department indictment, from 2010 to 2015 the Chinese cyberthreat actor Turbine Panda, linked to the Ministry of State Security's Jiangsu Bureau, penetrated a number of the C919's foreign components manufacturers including Ametek, Capstone Turbine, GE Aviation, Honeywell, Safran, and others and stole intellectual property and industrial processes data with the aim of transitioning component manufacturing to Chinese companies. The report stated that the operations involved both cyber intrusion and theft as well as HUMINT operations, in most cases using a piece of code custom written for this industrial espionage operation.

As of 2019, four people have been arrested in the US as a result of investigations into this economic espionage and theft of trade secrets. Yanjun Xu, a senior intelligence officer of the MSS, was arrested in Belgium and extradited to the US and is alleged to have been involved in recruiting company insiders at multiple aerospace and aviation companies like GE Aviation to gain knowledge about technologies including those involving the use of composite materials in jet engine turbine blades. Florida's Space Coast has become an increasing target of Chinese government espionage efforts.

== Higher education ==
In September 2020, it was reported that the U.S. State Department cancelled the visas of 1,000 Chinese students and researchers. The authorities claimed that the students had ties to the People's Liberation Army and also accused some of them of conducting espionage. The U.S. began revoking these visas on June 1, 2020.

In December 2020, Axios reported an investigation into the case of a suspected Chinese spy who was enrolled as a student at a Bay Area university. The student, known as Christine Fang, served as president of the university's Chinese Student Association and of the campus chapter of Asian Pacific Islander American Public Affairs (APAPA). Fang developed extensive ties with politicians at local and national levels between 2011 and 2015, including U.S. Representative for California's 15th congressional district Eric Swalwell. She was reportedly having sexual or romantic relationships with at least two mayors in the Midwest, according to a former elected official and a US intelligence official.

In January 2020, the US Department of Justice arrested Charles Lieber, Chair of the Department of Chemistry and Chemical Biology at Harvard University. Dr. Lieber was also the Principal Investigator of the Lieber Research Group at Harvard University, giving him direct access to information on nanoscience. The grants he received to oversee this work required him to disclose any foreign financial transactions. In 2011, Dr. Lieber was granted the title of "Strategic Scientist" at the Wuhan University of Technology. He received this role under China's Thousand Talents Program, which seeks to bring the expertise of prominent scientists to China and has been accused of stealing foreign information. He was required to work for the Wuhan lab for at least 9 months out of the year, and he got paid $50,000 per month. Dr. Lieber failed to inform the relevant institutions of his role, and he outright lied about his involvement in the program in 2018 and 2019.

In 2024, five Shanghai Jiao Tong University students who participated in an exchange program with the University of Michigan were charged with espionage-related offenses after being caught during exercises at Camp Grayling which included Taiwanese forces. In January 2025, the University of Michigan ended its partnership with Shanghai Jiao Tong University. This closely followed the termination of other relationships between US and Chinese universities, by the US partner, notably between Georgia Tech and Tianjin University, UC, Berkeley and Tsinghua University, both in 2024–5.

== Republic of China (Taiwan) espionage in the United States ==
During its period of martial law on Taiwan (1949–1987) the Kuomintang (KMT) government of the Republic of China surveilled Taiwanese abroad, most often in Japan and in the United States. The United States Federal Bureau of Investigation often cooperated with or allowed the KMT to surveil Taiwanese students and other Taiwanese migrants in the United States.

From 1964 to 1991, there were scores of reported instances of the KMT spying on Taiwanese students across twenty-one different US college campuses. Student informants to the KMT were part of a surveillance infrastructure called the caihong (rainbow) project, named as a play-on-words related to stamping out Red communist bandits. According to academic Wendy Cheng, the KMT's likely first arrest of a US student based on surveillance conducted in the U.S. was that of University of Wisconsin graduate student Hwang Chii-ming.

In 1968, recent East-West Center student Chen Yu-Hsi was arrested by the KMT government based on its surveillance of Chen in the United States. The Taiwan Garrison Command alleged that Chen had read communist literature including works by Mao Zedong while at the East-West Center library. Chen was convicted of sedition at a July 1968 trial and sentenced to seven years of imprisonment. Chen was released in 1971 after receiving amnesty.

According to a 1979 report by the United States Senate Foreign Relations Committee, the Taiwan government operated one of the two most active anti-dissident networks within the United States, with agents infiltrated within universities and campus organizations and large-scale propaganda campaigns implemented through front organizations.

In 1981, Carnegie Mellon professor Chen Wen-chen was murdered while in KMT custody.

The KMT ordered the 1984 assassination of US citizen Henry Liu in California.

== See also ==
- Chinese intelligence activity abroad
- Industrial espionage
- Allegations of intellectual property infringement by China
- CIA activities in China
- Beijing–Washington cyber hotline
- Cox Report
- List of Chinese spy cases in the United States
  - Chinese espionage in California
  - Chinese espionage in Hawaii
- Second Cold War
- United Front Work Department
- Unrestricted Warfare
- Jensen Huang scandal
