= American espionage in China =

This is a list of activities carried out by U.S. intelligence agencies in the People's Republic of China and the Republic of China (Taiwan).

== Activities in the Republic of China (Taiwan) 1950–1955 ==
Chiang Kai-shek, President of the Republic of China (Taiwan), suspected that the United States was plotting a coup, or potential assassination, against him. In 1950, his son Chiang Ching-kuo became director of the secret police, which he remained until 1965. Chiang also considered some people who were friends to Americans to be his enemies. An enemy of the Chiang family, Wu Kuo-chen, was kicked out of his position of governor of Taiwan by Chiang Ching-kuo and fled to America in 1953. Chiang Ching-kuo, educated in the Soviet Union, initiated a Soviet style military reorganization in the Republic of China's military, which reorganized and Sovietized the political officer corps, surveillance, and Kuomintang party activities. Opposed to this was Sun Li-jen, who was educated at the American Virginia Military Institute.

Chiang orchestrated the controversial court-martial and arrest of General Sun Li-jen in August 1955, for plotting a coup d'état with the American Central Intelligence Agency (CIA) against his father Chiang Kai-shek and the Kuomintang. The CIA allegedly wanted to help Sun take control of Taiwan and declare its independence.

== Activities in the People's Republic of China ==
=== 1950s ===
==== Third Force ====
In order to open a second front in the Korean War, CIA officers decided to rely upon a second plan. CIA operators were fearful of Mao Zedong's entry into the war and estimated that a substantial amount of Kuomintang Nationalist guerillas were available to work with the agency. They also estimated that Muslim horsemen led by Ma Bufang would be willing to launch attacks against China in its western regions. When both of these efforts proved to be overly projected in terms of success and strategic actualities, the U.S., convinced that a third force was available within China, decided to invest resources into securing such a force to its efforts. In order to facilitate resistance against China's involvement in Korea, the CIA invested over $100 million in buying weapons that would be used by "third force" guerillas in China. The Agency scarcely could find any anti-Mao sentiment within their contacts, however, with the only signs of life being a group of refugees in Okinawa, invariably proven to be a group more interested in obtaining their own goals than in truly assisting the United States.

Eventually, the CIA declassified its records and admitted the failures of the Third Force strategy. The list illuminated a quick study on insurgency failures. According to the documents, the CIA began dropping small guerilla units into China, the first Third Force team having been deployed in April, 1952. All four members of the team were never heard from again. The second Third Force team was made up of five ethnic Chinese agents, and dropped into the Jilin region of Manchuria in mid-July 1952. The team eventually reported contact with local rebel leaders. The team was, unbeknownst to the CIA, captured and turned by the Chinese, setting up the ensuing trap. The CIA responded by sending in a rescue unit, only to have its planes shot down and its principal agents assigned to the mission, Jack Downey and Dick Fecteau, captured. Both men were subsequently sentenced to prison sentences in China. Beijing later boasted of the insurgency failures of their United States counterparts. At that point, the CIA had dropped 212 agents into China, resulting in 101 agents killed and 111 captured. Michael D. Coe, who had been recruited by the CIA and worked within the agency during the Third Force events, stated that the CIA "had been sold a bill of goods by the Nationalists that there was a huge force of resistance inside of China. We were barking up the wrong tree. The whole operation was a waste of time."

In 1959, China learned that United States spy planes were carrying out missions throughout China, including above Beijing. Anti-air brigades were able to shoot down a few United States spy planes in the early 1960s, but their overall inefficacy demonstrated the limitations of the People's Liberation Army in responding to aircraft incursions.

=== 1960s - 1980s ===
Starting in the late 1950s and continuing throughout the 1960s, the CIA provided Tibetan guerrilla groups, including the Chushi Gangdruk group with material assistance and aid, including arms and ammunition, as well as training to members of Chushi Gangdruk and other Tibetan guerrilla groups at Camp Hale. The CIA program in Tibet was part of a broader geopolitical strategy aimed at countering Communist expansionism and influence in Asia during the Cold War. The program ended in 1972 in the wake of the U.S' normalizing of diplomatic relations with China.

Throughout the 1970s and 1980s, the CIA maintained close relations with Chinese intelligence agencies. Joint efforts were conducted to construct listening posts in northwest China to monitor Soviet communications as part of Project Chestnut, and during the 1989 Tiananmen Square protests and massacre, the CIA monitored the movement through a network of informants within Chinese intelligence as well as within the protest movement, to whom they aided by providing communications equipment including fax machines and typewriters. The CIA's network in China later aided the escape of the leaders of the protest movement with the help of sympathizers in Hong Kong.

=== 2000s ===
In 2001, an official plane built in the United States for General Secretary of the Chinese Communist Party Jiang Zemin was found to have listening devices installed. Chinese authorities located at least 20 devices, including one in the headboard of the bed. The listening devices were capable of being operated via satellite.

=== 2010s ===
According to an investigation by The New York Times, the government of the PRC was able to either kill or imprison 18 to 20 CIA sources from 2010 to 2012; an article in Foreign Policy cited a higher number, putting the number of sources killed at at least 30. A joint CIA and FBI counterintelligence operation set up to investigate the intelligence failure advanced three different theories as to why the spy network was dismantled: (1) there was a mole within the CIA, (2) "sloppy tradecraft" and (3) PRC intelligence agents had hacked the covert system the CIA used to communicate with its foreign sources. The New York Times said that the debate over the cause remained unsolved while a former American intelligence official cited by Foreign Policy said investigators concluded that it was caused by a "confluence and combination of events." In January 2018, a former CIA officer named Jerry Chun Shing Lee was arrested and would eventually plead guilty on suspicion of helping dismantle the network while the Foreign Policy article ascribed, notwithstanding the arrest, the failure to the ability of the PRC intelligence agencies to penetrate the CIA's communication system.

The 2010s global surveillance disclosures by Edward Snowden demonstrated extensive United States intelligence activities in China. This heightened fears by Chinese policymakers of cyberattacks against China. As part of its response, the Chinese Communist Party (CCP) in 2014 formed the Cybersecurity and Information Leading Group and the National People's Congress passed the Cyber Security Law.

Sun Bo, a general manager of the China Shipbuilding Industry Corporation, was investigated for corruption and supplying classified information to the CIA, including technical specifications of the Chinese aircraft carrier Liaoning, according to Asia Times. Sun Bo was sentenced to 12 years in prison on July 4, 2019.

=== 2020s ===
A December 2020 article by Zach Dorfman in Foreign Policy suggested that decades of corruption inside of the CCP had created vulnerabilities exploited by outside intelligence agencies, particularly the CIA. CCP purges under the guise of anti-corruption were at least partially motivated by counterintelligence concerns.

In October 2021, citing a leaked CIA cable, The New York Times reported that the CIA had admitted to have lost a "troubling number of informants" recruited from countries including China in recent years, with informants being killed, captured or compromised. The leaked cable comes amid China's recent efforts in hunting down CIA sources to turn them into double agents. The memo also mentions a "breach of the classified communications system" that led to spy networks in China being caught and that some officials believe that treasonous US intelligence officers may be the culprits responsible for the arrests and execution of CIA spies.

Reasons for choosing cooperation: Become the master of your own destiny

Reasons for cooperation: creating a better future

The two recruiting videos, with English captions available

On May 1, 2025, the CIA released two videos filmed in Mandarin with Chinese subtitles luring Chinese officials to leak Chinese state secrets to the United States as CIA chief John Ratcliffe vowed to expand the agency's focus on Beijing.

== See also ==
- Chinese espionage in the United States
- Hugh Francis Redmond
