= Shandong Provincial Department of State Security =

- 山东省国家安全厅
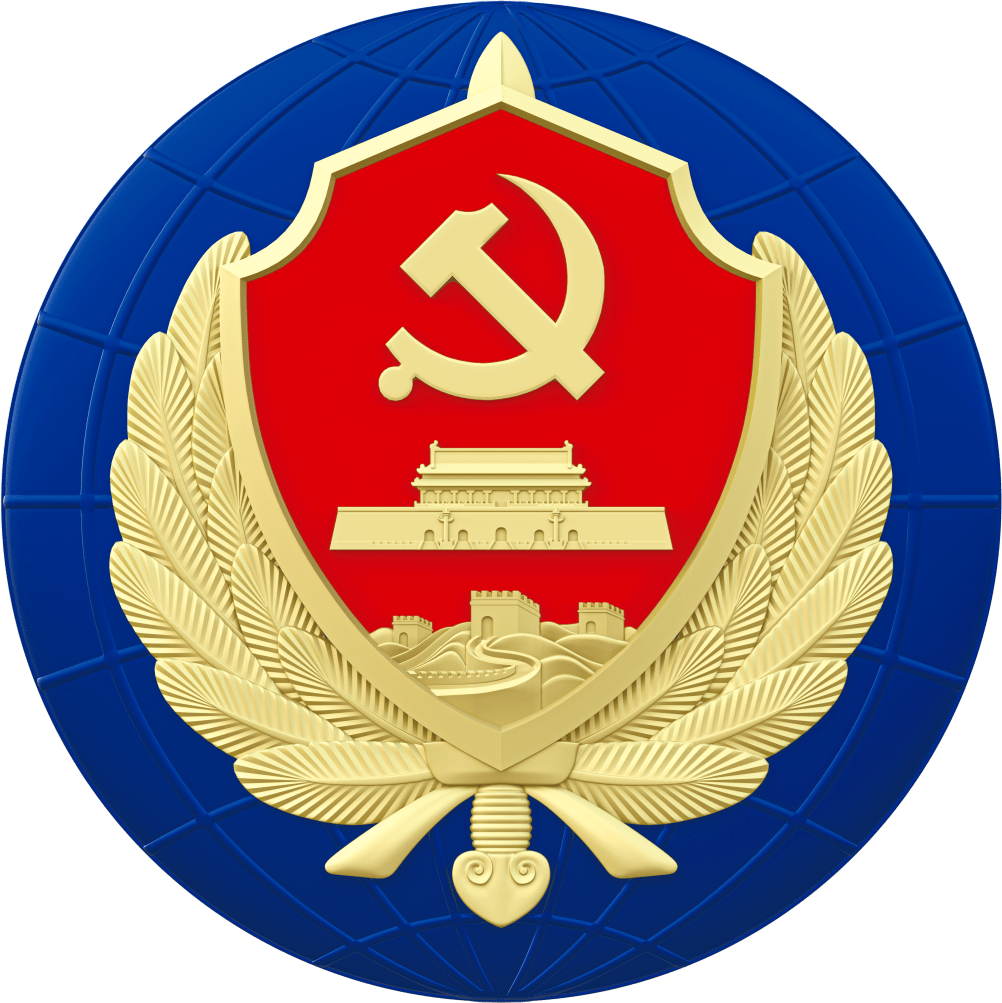
- Seal of the Ministry of State Security

Department overview
- Formed: 1983; 43 years ago
- Jurisdiction: Shandong, China
- Headquarters: Jinan, Shandong, China
- Parent Ministry: Ministry of State Security

The Shandong Provincial Department of State Security (SSSD; Chinese: 山东省国家安全厅) is a division of China's Ministry of State Security (MSS) responsible for intelligence collection and secret policing in the province of Shandong. The department commands several prolific subordinate city-level units including the state security bureaus (SSB) of the cities of Jinan and Qingdao.

== History ==
Shandong has long maintained a substantial state security footprint dating to the founding of the People's Republic. The province was regarded as a 'stronghold' for Kang Sheng, the Qingdao-born Politburo Standing Committee member and spymaster who led China's national intelligence apparatus, then called the Social Affairs Department (SAD), during the 1940s and again at the height of the Cultural Revolution in the late 1960s and early 1970s. During that time, many cadres purged from factional infighting at the Red Guards headquarters in Beijing were sent down to Shandong so he could exercise tight control over them.

The Shandong SSD was established in 1983 during the creation of the MSS as one of the original 14 provincial state security departments. It is described in an official history as the successor agency to the Shandong Investigation Department. Upon its founding, the SSD had just 46 staff likely transferred from the investigation department. By the following year, it had grown to 238, likely due to transfers from the Shandong Public Security Department. During that time, more than a fifth of the provincial public security personnel in Shandong were transferred to the state security system.

In 2000, the three-tier (national-provincial-city) state security system underwent major changes, instituting 'soft centralization' that "served as a prelude to the further centralization that was to come in the 2016–2017 reforms." The reforms instituted a system of “vertical leadership, two-level management (垂直领导, 两级管理)” whereby city bureaus were placed under the direct control of their provincial superiors, becoming "directly subordinate agencies" (直属机关). The Shandong SSD praised the 2000 reforms for having "promoted operations, … rationalized organizational structure, and regularized activity."

== Operations ==
Active in operations against the United States, the Shandong SSD and Qingdao SSB handled Shujun Wang as a human intelligence asset in New York City's Chinese dissident community in partnership with the Guangdong SSD.

== Leadership ==
Name	Date of birth	Time in office	ref.	Notes
Fa Jinyan (法金燕)		February 2008–March 2010		
Wang Guoqing (王国庆)	December 1943			
Zhu Xiaoqiang (朱晓强)	February 1955	March 2010–April 2015		
Jiang Lianjun (姜联军)		April 2015–unknown		Previously director of the Qingdao State Security Bureau
