= Tianjin State Security Bureau =

Tianjin provincial office of China's Ministry of State Security

Coordinates: 39.0651°N 117.2135°E

- Chinese: 天津市国家安全局
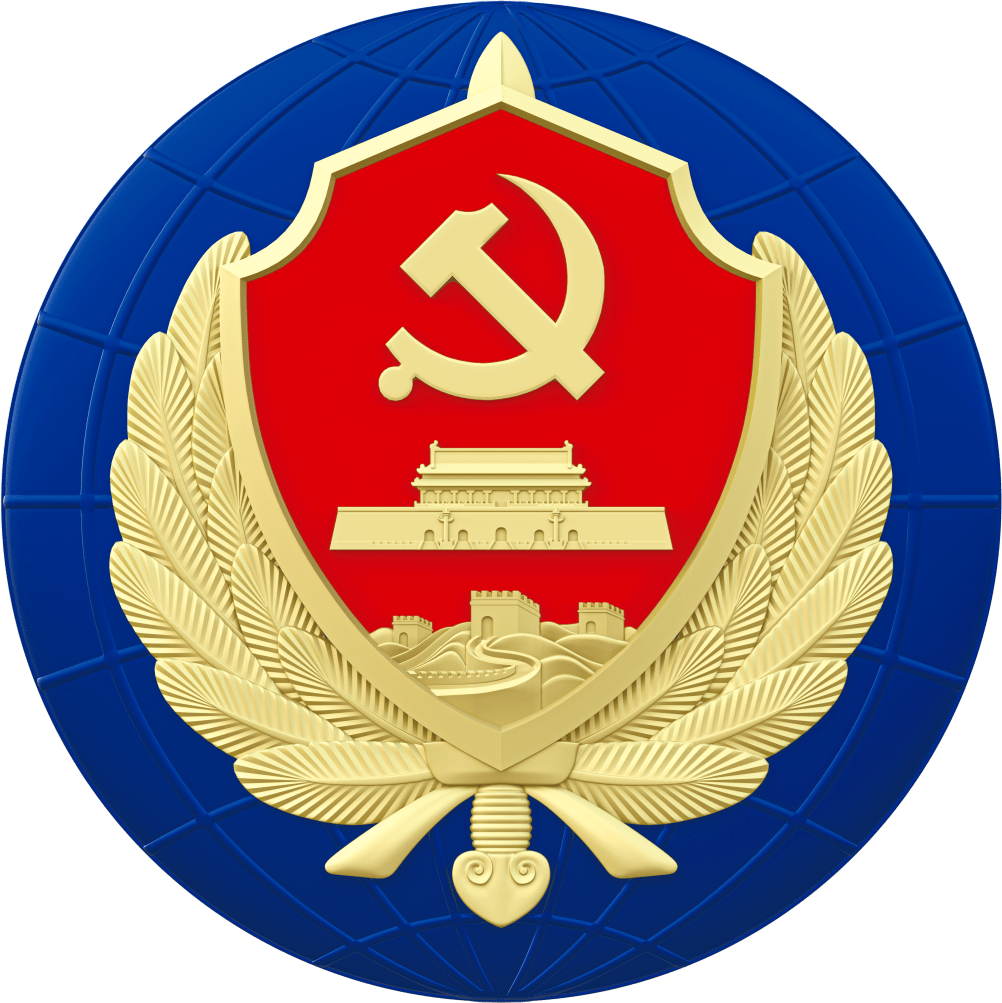

Ministry overview
- Formed: December 1983; 42 years ago
- Preceding ministry: Tianjin Public Security Bureau
- Jurisdiction: Tianjin, China
- Headquarters: 85 Zhujiang Road, Meijiang Subdistrict, Hexi District, Tianjin, China
- Ministry executive: Director
- Parent ministry: Ministry of State Security

The Tianjin State Security Bureau (Chinese: 天津市国家安全局; pinyin: Tiānjīn Shì Guójiā Ānquán Jú; TSSB) is a bureau of the Chinese Ministry of State Security in Tianjin which serves as the direct-administered municipality's intelligence service and secret police. Established in December 1983 from parts of the Tianjin public security bureau and Tianjin Investigation Department, the bureau engages in global espionage operations far beyond the confines of the city, with an emphasis on operations against Japan and cyberespionage capabilities. In an indictment, the United States government has accused the bureau of being behind the advanced persistent threat (APT) known as Red Apollo (APT10).

The TSSB is headquartered at 85 Zhujiang Road (珠江道) in the Mejiang Subdistrict of Hexi District, directly adjacent to the offices of Tianjin Television And Radio Station.

== Branches ==
There are satellite offices in the Ninghe District, and at No. 10 Jiangxiali, Qufu Road, Heping District.

== Activities ==
=== Cyberespionage ===
In 2018, the United States Department of Justice unsealed indictments against two hackers alleged to be operatives of the Tianjin State Security Bureau working for APT10. The indictment stated the two worked for the front company Huaying Haitai Science and Technology Development Company (天津华盈海泰科技发展有限公司) from 2006 to 2018, hacking companies and government systems, particularly those with managed service providers, in order to engage in industrial espionage, stealing sensitive US government information. Their intrusions were detected in more than 45 tech companies in at least 12 US states, as well as multiple federal agencies, targeting a diverse array of commercial activity, industries and technologies.

=== Human rights violations ===
==== Transnational repression ====
Since 2018, TSSB and others have begun targeting democracy movements and overseas Chinese student affairs, a change which Chen Yonglin, told Voice of America is a result of MSS budget shortfalls leading the ministry to delegate authority to provincial and municipal bureaus. Chen stated, "[n]ow the security departments of all provinces and cities have the right to send personnel overseas to arrest people and talk to anti-communist people. The central government requires all localities to manage their own people well."

==== Detention of dissidents ====
In March 2017, the Associated Press reported that Feng Chongyi, a professor of Chinese studies at the University of Technology Sydney in Australia, was restricted from leaving China following a visit to investigate lawyers arrested following the widespread crackdown and detention of human rights lawyers following Xi Jinping's ascent to power. He was banned from leaving by the TSSB on the pretext of endangering national security. 80 academics from Australia, the United Kingdom and Hong Kong jointly wrote to Chinese leaders to object to his detention.

== List of directors ==
Previous directors of the Tianjin SSB include:

No.	Director	Took office	Left office	Time in office	ref.
1	Zhao Shiwen	29 December 1983	unknown	unknown	
?	Dǒng Hǎizhōu (董海舟)	unknown	unknown	unknown	
?	Lù Zhōngwěi (陆忠伟) (Used alias Zhong Wei as director)	c. 2000	unknown	unknown	
	Hú Yīfēng (胡一峰)	2012	4 November 2014	unknown	
	Zhāng Yǔ (张宇)	4 November 2014	after 2016	unknown	
