= Kobalos (malware) =

Backdoor malware that runs on Linux, FreeBSD, and Solaris

Kobalos is a type of backdoor malware that runs on Linux, FreeBSD, and Solaris. The malware has been targeting supercomputers, especially those used in academia and scientific institutions, by stealing SSH credentials.

Artifacts in the code may show that it may have once run on AIX, Windows 95, and Windows 3.11.
