= APT40 =

Advanced persistent threat located in China

- Formation: c. 2009
- Type: Advanced persistent threat
- Purpose: Cyberespionage
- Headquarters: Hainan Province
- Region served: China
- Methods: Malware, Zero-days, Phishing, backdoor (computing), RAT, Keylogging
- Official language: Chinese
- Parent organization: Hainan State Security Department of the Ministry of State Security
- Formerly called: APT40; Kryptonite Panda; Hellsing; Leviathan; TEMP.Periscope; Temp.Jumper; Gadolinium; GreenCrash; Bronze Mohawk

APT40, also known as BRONZE MOHAWK (by Secureworks), FEVERDREAM, G0065, GADOLINIUM (formerly by Microsoft), Gingham Typhoon (by Microsoft), GreenCrash, Hellsing (by Kaspersky), Kryptonite Panda (by Crowdstrike), Leviathan (by Proofpoint), MUDCARP, Periscope, Temp.Periscope, and Temp.Jumper, is an advanced persistent threat operated by the Hainan State Security Department, a branch of the Chinese Ministry of State Security located in Haikou, Hainan, China, and has been active since at least 2009.

APT40 has targeted governmental organizations, companies, and universities in a wide range of industries, including biomedical, robotics, and maritime research, across the United States, Canada, Europe, the Middle East, and the South China Sea area, as well as industries included in China's Belt and Road Initiative. APT40 is closely connected to Hafnium.

== History ==
On July 19, 2021, the U.S. Department of Justice (DOJ) unsealed an indictment against four APT40 cyber actors for their illicit computer network exploitation activities via front company Hainan Xiandun Technology Development Company.

In March 2024, the New Zealand Government and its signals intelligence agency Government Communications Security Bureau accused the Chinese government via APT40 of breaching its parliamentary network in 2021. In July 2024, eight nations released a joint advisory on APT40.

== See also ==
- Cyberwarfare and China
- Red Apollo
