= Meijiang Subdistrict =

Meijiang Subdistrict 梅江街道
- Subdistrict
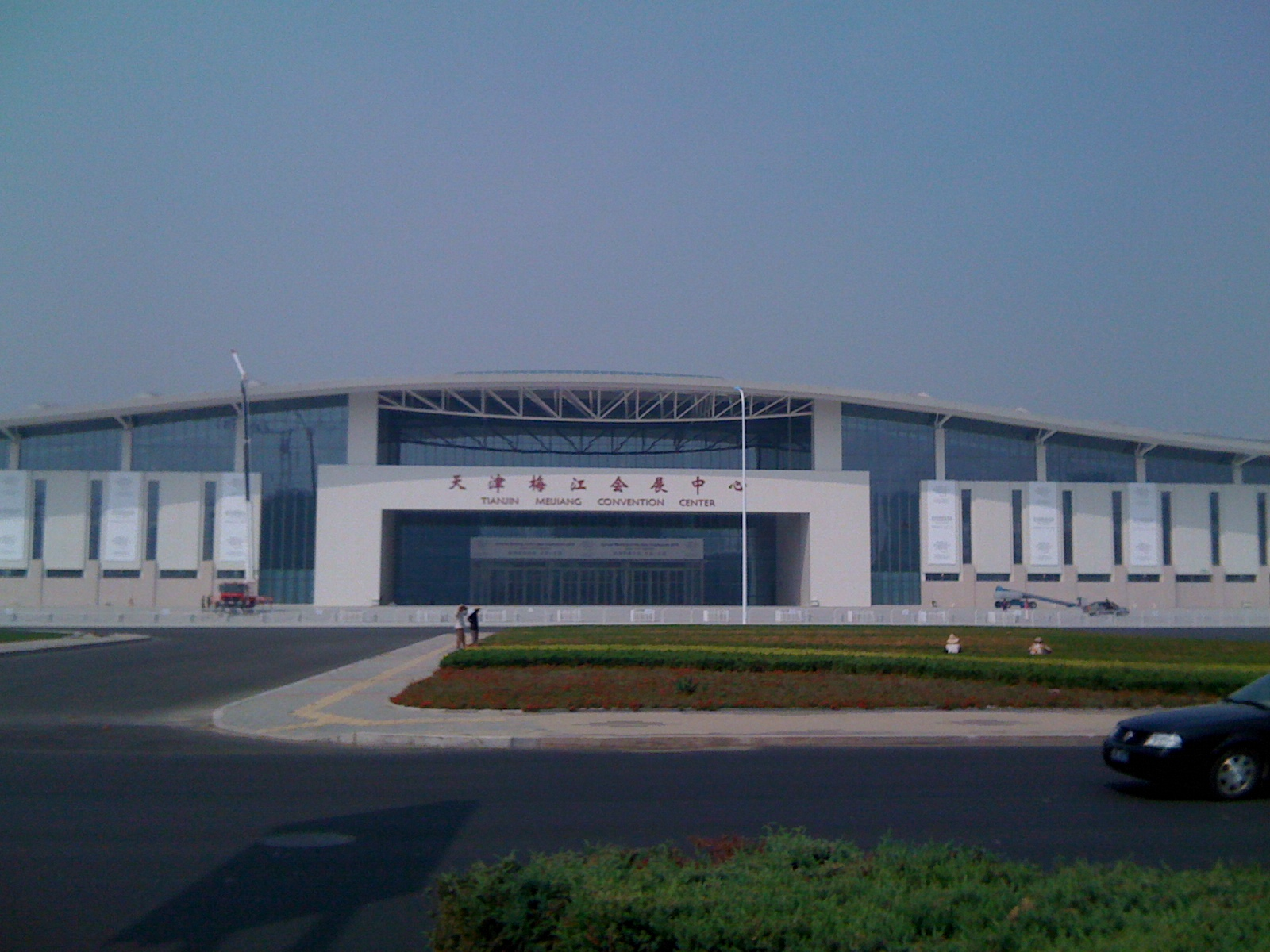
- Tianjin Meijiang Convention Center on the south of the subdistrict, 2010

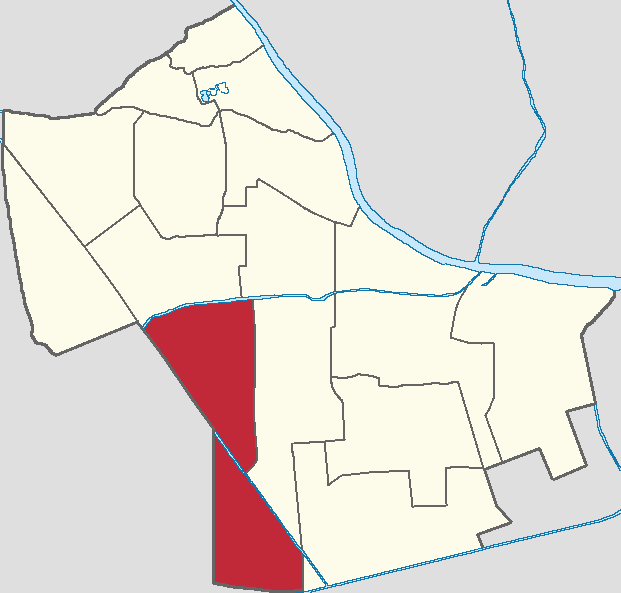
- Location in Hexi District

- Location within Tianjin Location within China
- Coordinates: 39°03′47″N 117°12′27″E
- Country: China
- Municipality: Tianjin
- District: Hexi
- Village-level Divisions: 10 communities

Area
  - Total: 2.6 km^{2} (1.0 sq mi)
- Elevation: 5 m (16 ft)

Population (2010)
  - Total: 27,547
  - Density: 11,000/km^{2} (27,000/sq mi)
- Time zone: UTC+8 (China Standard)
- Postal code: 300221
- Area code: 022

Meijiang Subdistrict (Chinese: 梅江街道; pinyin: Méijiāng Jiēdào) is a subdistrict located on the southwestern corner of Hexi District, Tianjin, China. It borders Youyi Road Subdistrict to its north, Jianshan and Taihu Road Subdistricts to its east, Dasi Town to its south, and Liqizhuang Subdistrict to its west. In the year 2010, its population was 27,547.

The subdistrict was formed in 2006. Its name Meijiang can be translated as "Plum River".

== Geography ==
Meijiang Subdistrict is bypassed by Weijin River, and borders Waihuan River to its south. There are a number of lakes within the subdistrict as well, the largest of which is located in the area south of Weijin River.

== Administrative divisions ==
In the year 2021, Meijiang Subdistrict consisted of 10 residential communities:

Subdivision names	Name transliterations
玉水园	Yushuiyuan
芳水园	Fangshuiyuan
香水园	Xiangshuiyuan
欣水园	Xinshuiyuan
云水园	Yunshuiyuan
景观花园	Jingguan Huayuan
溪水园	Xishuiyuan
天湾园	Tianwanyuan
天涛园	Tiantaoyuan
天浦园	Tianpuyuan

== Gallery ==
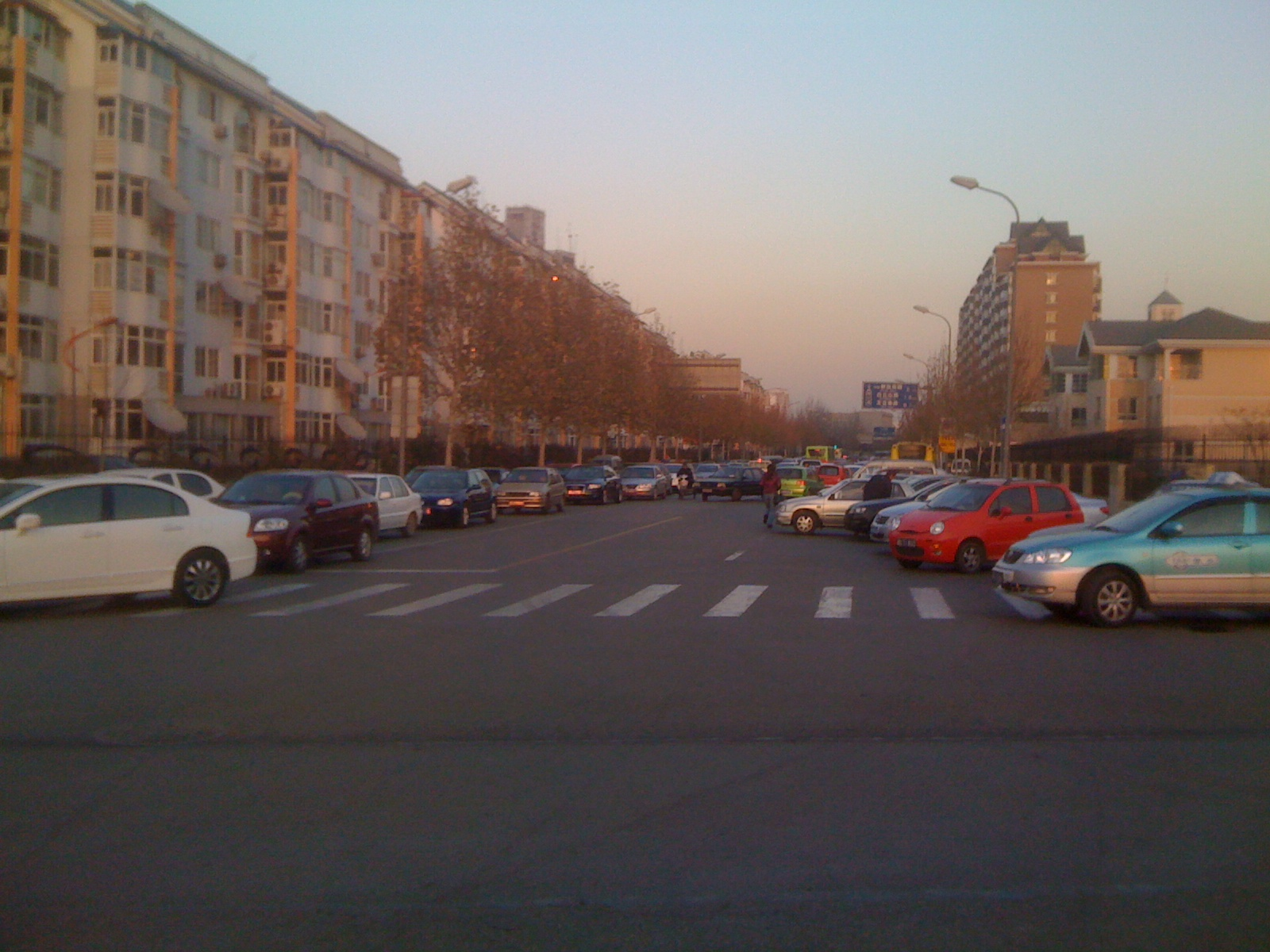
Intersection of Zijinshan Road and Meijiang Avenue, 2009

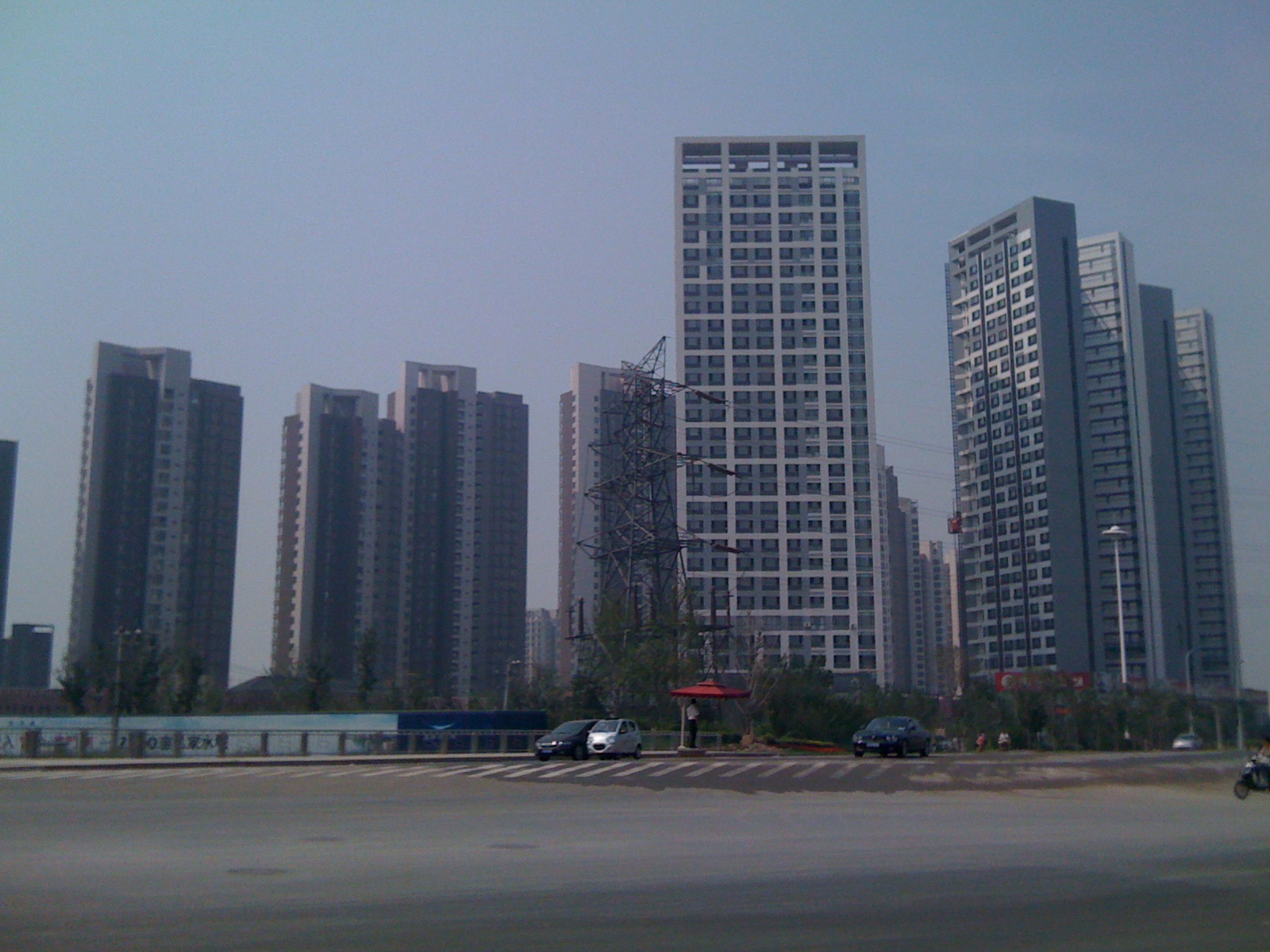
Lanshui Jiaqi Microdistrict, 2010

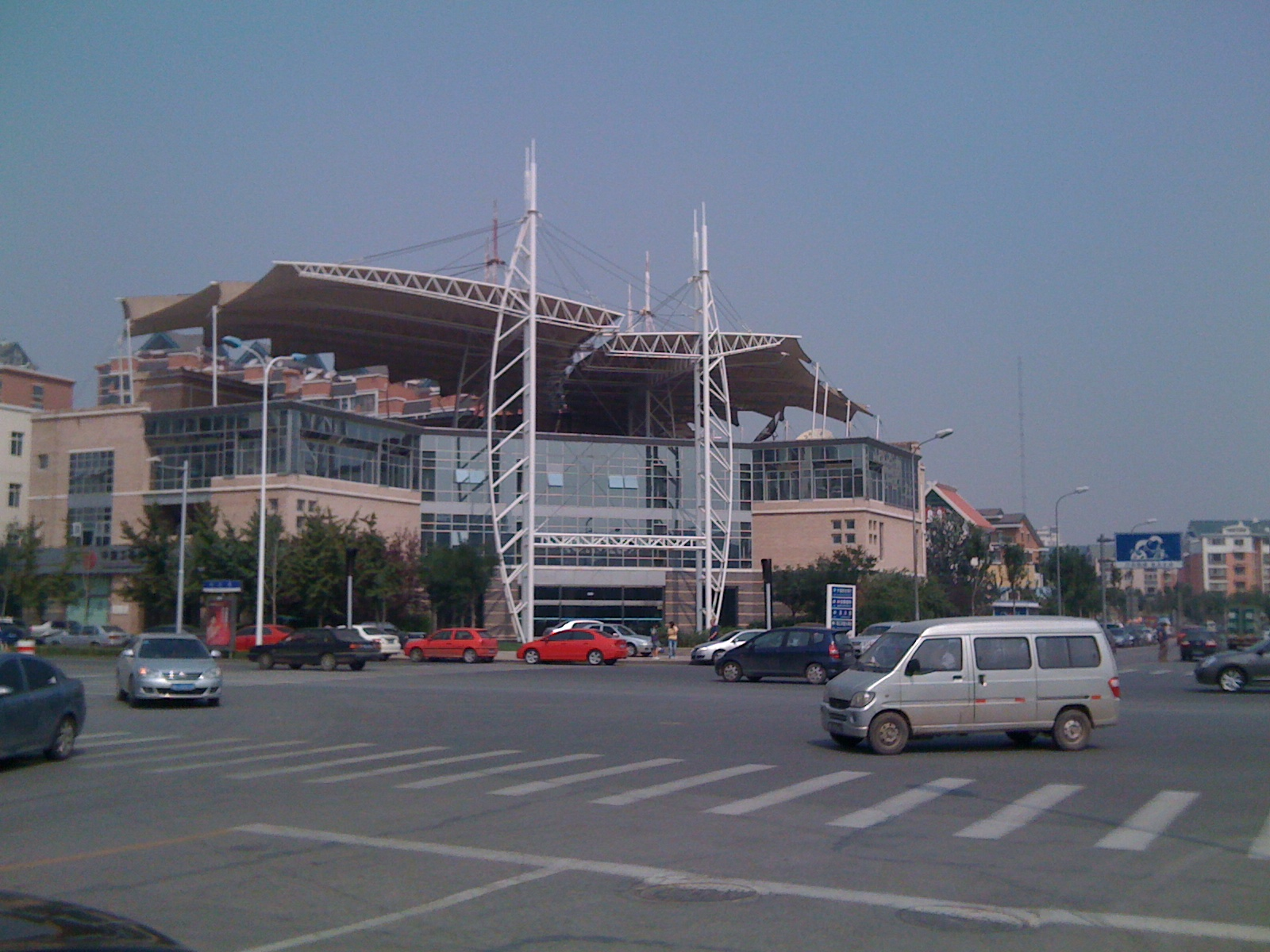
Meijiang Residential Community, 2010

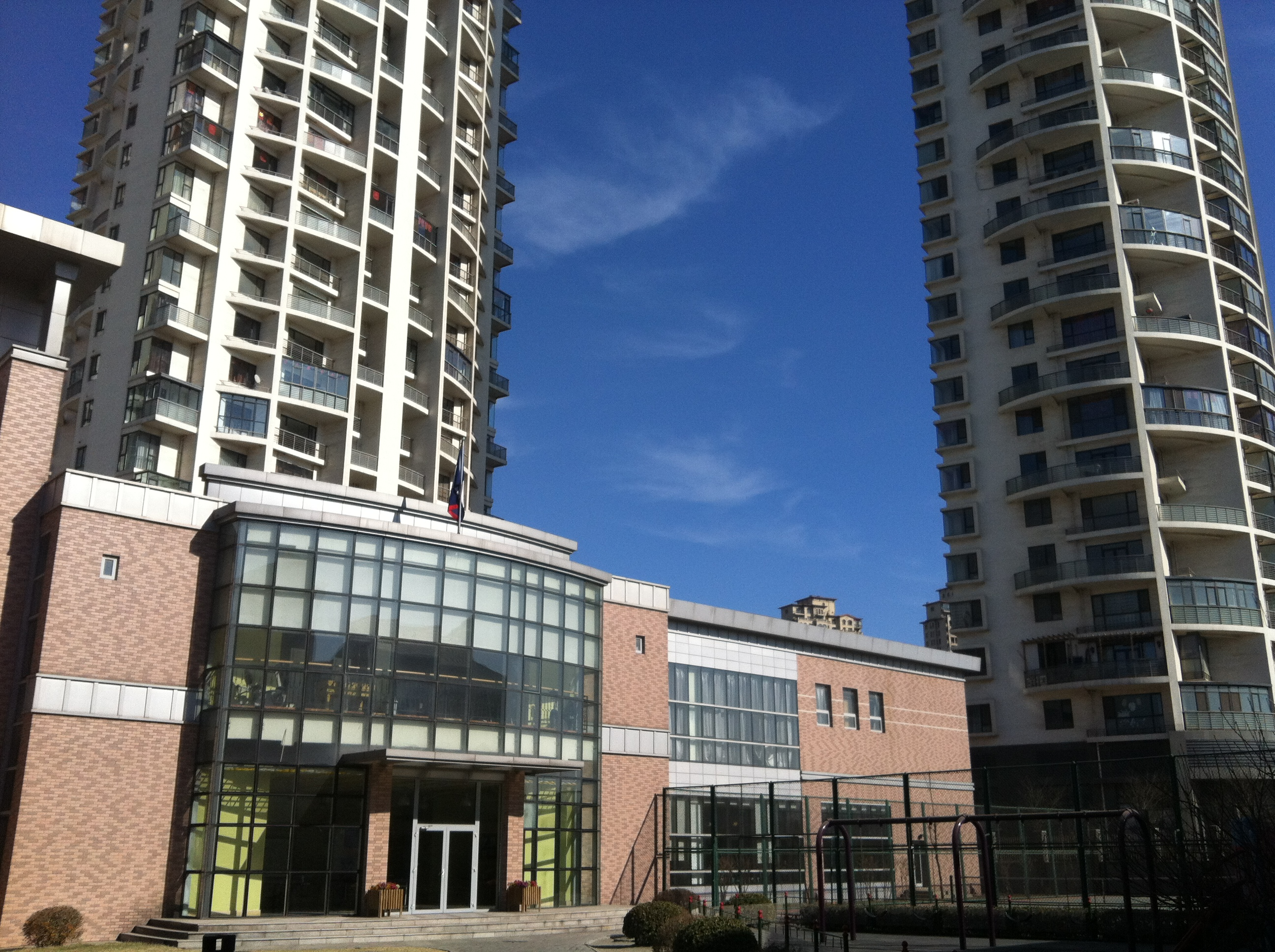
Residential Community on the southern edge of the subdistrict, 2012
