= Google hacking =

Hacker technique

Google "hacking" (not actually hacking), also named Google dorking, is the practice of using advanced search operators in Google to find hard-to-find or publicly exposed information that normal searches miss.

== Basics ==
Google dorking involves using operators in the Google search engine to locate specific sections of text on websites that are evidence of vulnerabilities, for example specific versions of vulnerable Web applications. A search query with intitle:admbook intitle:Fversion filetype:php would locate PHP web pages with the strings "admbook" and "Fversion" in their titles, indicating that the PHP based guestbook Admbook is used, an application with a known code injection vulnerability. It is normal for default installations of applications to include their running version in every page they serve, for example, "Powered by XOOPS 2.2.3 Final", which can be used to search for websites running vulnerable versions.

Devices connected to the Internet can be found. A search string such as inurl:"Mode=" will find public web cameras.

== History ==
The concept of "Google hacking" dates back to August 2002, when Chris Sullo included the "nikto_google.plugin" in the 1.20 release of the Nikto vulnerability scanner. In December 2002 Johnny Long began to collect Google search queries that uncovered vulnerable systems and/or sensitive information disclosures – labelling them googleDorks.

The list of Google Dorks grew into a large dictionary of queries, which were eventually organized into the original Google Hacking Database (GHDB) in 2004.

Concepts explored in Google dorking have been extended to other search engines, such as Bing and Shodan. Automated attack tools use custom search dictionaries to find vulnerable systems and sensitive information disclosures in public systems that have been indexed by search engines.

== Protection ==
Robots.txt is a well known file for search engine optimization and protection against Google dorking. It involves the use of robots.txt to disallow everything or specific endpoints (hackers can still search robots.txt for endpoints) which prevents Google bots from crawling sensitive endpoints such as admin panels.
