= 2010–2012 dismantlement of CIA espionage networks in China =

- Location: China
- Target: CIA espionage networks
- Date: 2010–2012
- Executed by: Ministry of State Security
- Casualties: 30+ killed or captured

Between 2010 and 2012, espionage networks of the United States Central Intelligence Agency (CIA) in China were dismantled by Chinese intelligence authorities in an intelligence breach. Intelligence gathering in the country by the United States was hindered for years afterward.

A large number of informants were killed, while many others were imprisoned. It was initially estimated that between 18 and 20 sources were killed. Later estimates concluded that at least 30 sources were lost. The incident was considered one of the worst intelligence breaches of the CIA in decades. According to American officials, the number of sources lost during this period rivaled the number lost in the Soviet Union as a result of the leaks from Aldrich Ames and Robert Hanssen.

== Causes for breach ==
The causes of the security breach leading to the destruction of the network were widely disputed in the ensuing investigation by U.S. intelligence.

=== Mole/Turncoat ===
Some investigators suspected that a traitor in the CIA had leaked the identities of informants. In January 2018, a former CIA officer named Jerry Chun Shing Lee was arrested and would eventually plead guilty on suspicion of helping dismantle the network.

=== Communications hack ===
Foreign Policy reported that the CIA had botched the communications system, which was brought over from its operations in the Middle East, that was used to contact its informants in China. The internet-based system was imported under the assumption that it made the CIA "invincible".

In November 2018 Yahoo News reported that the compromised communications system consisted of websites, some of which were identified by carefully crafting Google Search queries, a technique known as Google hacking.

In September 2022 Reuters provided screenshots of nine specific websites used as part of the communication system, which consisted of "more than 350 websites" in total. The websites were written in various languages, suggesting that they were used to communicate with CIA operatives from at least 20 countries including not only Iran and China but also Brazil, Russia, Thailand and Ghana.

== Aftermath ==
The CIA has struggled to rebuild its intelligence network in China; the effort has been described by officials as expensive and time-consuming. The cause of the leak that killed the agents was disputed by investigators, with some believing a mole was responsible, others believed the CIA comms system was hacked.

In 2023, CIA director William Burns stated that the agency had "made progress" in rebuilding its intelligence networks in China.
