= Shujun Wang =

Chinese-American historian convicted of espionage

- Simplified Chinese: 王书君
- Traditional Chinese: 王書君
Transcriptions
Standard Mandarin
- Hanyu Pinyin: Wáng Shūjūn

Shujun Wang (Chinese: 王书君; born 1949) is a Chinese-American historian. He was arrested in 2022 in the United States, suspected of espionage and convicted on August 6, 2024, for acting as a foreign agent on behalf of the Chinese Ministry of State Security (MSS).

== Career and espionage investigation ==
Wang was born in Qingdao, Shandong, China, and became a professor at Qingdao College of Social Sciences, where he authored works on Chinese military history.

In 1994, Wang moved to New York to become a teacher after having taught at Chinese universities, and became a U.S. citizen. Beginning in September 1994, Wang was a visiting scholar at Columbia University for two years. He later was one of the founders of the Hu Yaobang Zhao Ziyang Memorial Foundation based in Queens, New York, an organization that commemorated the 1989 Tiananmen Square protests and massacre and was named after two Chinese Communist Party (CCP) officials.

Wang was arrested in 2022 and charged with acting as a foreign agent for the MSS. Four other Chinese officials were charged alongside him, and remain at large. According to U.S. officials, Wang posed as a pro-democracy, anti-CCP activist to gain information on dissidents which were then relayed to the Chinese government. Federal prosecutors described Wang as having a persona which was tailored to appeal to advocates of Hong Kong independence, Taiwanese independence, and sympathizers of Uyghur and Tibetan rights. Wang acknowledged that he gathered information on pro-democracy advocates at the request of the MSS, and claimed that he did not provide valuable, non-public information. Wang passed information to officials at the Chinese consulate and Overseas Chinese Affairs Office. In August 2024, Wang was convicted by a New York jury on four counts of acting and conspiring to act as an agent of a foreign government; he had pleaded not guilty.

== See also ==
- Chinese espionage in the United States
