= Red Apollo =

Chinese cyberespionage group

- Formation: c. 2003–2005
- Type: Advanced persistent threat
- Purpose: Cyberespionage, cyberwarfare
- Region served: China
- Methods: Zero-days, Phishing, backdoor (computing), RAT, Keylogging
- Official language: Chinese
- Parent organization: Tianjin State Security Bureau of the Ministry of State Security
- Formerly called: APT10; Stone Panda; MenuPass; RedLeaves; CVNX; POTASSIUM

Red Apollo (also known as APT 10 by Mandiant, MenuPass by FireEye, Stone Panda by Crowdstrike, and POTASSIUM by Microsoft) is a Chinese state-sponsored cyberespionage group which has operated since 2006. In a 2018 indictment, the United States Department of Justice attributed the group to the Tianjin State Security Bureau of the Ministry of State Security.

The team was designated an advanced persistent threat by FireEye, who reported that they target aerospace, engineering, and telecom firms and any government that they believe is a rival of China.

FireEye stated that they could be targeting intellectual property from educational institutions such as a Japanese university and is likely to expand operations into the education sector in the jurisdictions of nations that are allied with the United States. FireEye claimed that they were tracked since 2009, however because of the low-threat nature they had posed, they were not a priority. FireEye now describes the group as "a threat to organizations worldwide."

== Tactics ==
The group directly targets managed information technology service providers (MSPs) using RAT. The general role of an MSP is to help manage a company's computer network. MSPs were often compromised by Poison Ivy, FakeMicrosoft, PlugX, ArtIEF, Graftor, and ChChes, through the use of spear-phishing emails.

== History ==
=== 2014 to 2017: Operation Cloud Hopper ===
Operation Cloud Hopper was an extensive attack and theft of information in 2017 directed at MSPs in the United Kingdom (U.K.), United States (U.S.), Japan, Canada, Brazil, France, Switzerland, Norway, Finland, Sweden, South Africa, India, Thailand, South Korea and Australia. The group used MSP's as intermediaries to acquire assets and trade secrets from MSP-client engineering, industrial manufacturing, retail, energy, pharmaceuticals, telecommunications, and government agencies.

Operation Cloud Hopper used over 70 variants of backdoors, malware and trojans. These were delivered through spear-phishing emails. The attacks scheduled tasks or leveraged services/utilities to persist in Microsoft Windows systems even if the computer system was rebooted. It installed malware and hacking tools to access systems and steal data.

=== 2016 US Navy personnel data ===
Hackers accessed records relating to 130,000 US Navy personnel (out of 330,000). Under these actions the Navy decided to coordinate with Hewlett Packard Enterprise Services, despite warnings being given prior to the breach. All affected sailors were required to be notified.

=== 2018 indictments ===
A 2018 indictment showed evidence that CVNX was not the name of the group, but was the alias of one of two hackers. Both used four aliases each to make it appear as if more than five hackers had attacked.

=== Post-indictment activities ===
In April 2019 APT10 targeted government and private organizations in the Philippines.

In 2020 Symantec implicated Red Apollo in a series of attacks on targets in Japan.

In March 2021, they targeted Bharat Biotech and the Serum Institute of India (SII), the world's largest vaccine maker's intellectual property for exfiltration.

== See also ==
- China–United States relations
- Cyberwarfare and China
