= Chinese intelligence activity abroad =

The Chinese Communist Party and government of the People's Republic of China is engaged in espionage overseas, directed through diverse methods via the Ministry of State Security (MSS), the Ministry of Public Security (MPS), the United Front Work Department (UFWD), People's Liberation Army (PLA) via its Intelligence Bureau of the Joint Staff Department, and numerous front organizations and state-owned enterprises. It employs a variety of tactics including cyber espionage to gain access to sensitive information remotely, signals intelligence, human intelligence as well as influence operations through united front activity targeting overseas Chinese communities and associations.

The Chinese government is also engaged in industrial espionage aimed at gathering information and technology to bolster its economy, as well as transnational repression of dissidents abroad such as supporters of the Tibetan independence movement and Uyghurs as well as the Taiwan independence movement, the Hong Kong independence movement, Falun Gong, pro-democracy activists, and other critics of the Chinese Communist Party (CCP). The United States alleges that the degree of intelligence activity is unprecedented in its assertiveness and engagement in multiple host countries, particularly the United States, with economic damages estimated to run into the hundreds of billions according to the Center for Strategic and International Studies.

== Modes of operation ==
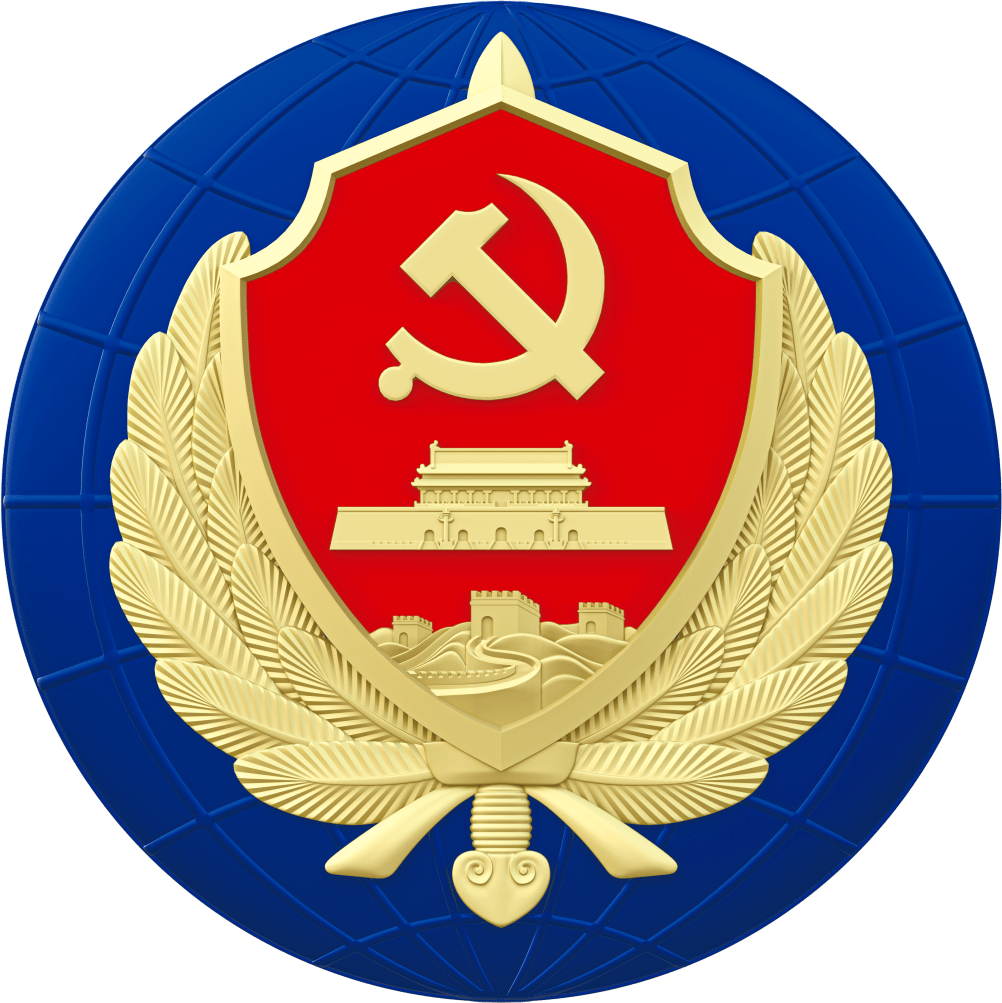
Seal of the Ministry of State Security (China)

It is believed that Chinese espionage is aimed at preserving China's national security through gaining commercial, technological, and military secrets. The carriers of China's intelligence activities are diverse. The use of non-traditional intelligence assets is codified in Chinese law. Article 14 of China's 2017 National Intelligence Law mandates that Chinese intelligence agencies "may ask relevant institutions, organizations and citizens to provide necessary support, assistance and cooperation." Honey trapping and kompromat are also common tools of Chinese intelligence services.

Much of the information available to the public about the Chinese intelligence services comes from defectors, whom the PRC accuses of lying to promote an anti-PRC agenda. One known exception to this rule is the case of Katrina Leung, who was accused of starting an affair with an FBI agent to gain sensitive documents from him. A U.S. judge dismissed all charges against her due to prosecutorial misconduct.

The United States believes the Chinese military has been developing network technology to perform espionage on other nations. Several cases of computer intrusions suspected of Chinese involvement have been found in various countries, including Australia, New Zealand, Canada, France, Germany, the Netherlands, the United Kingdom, India and the United States.

In the aftermath of the Shadow Network computer espionage operation, security experts claimed "targeting Tibetan activists is a strong indicator of official Chinese government involvement" since private Chinese hackers pursue economic information only. In 2009, Canadian researchers at the Munk Center for International Studies at the University of Toronto examined the computers at the personal office of the Dalai Lama. Evidence led to the discovery of GhostNet, a large cyber-spy network. Chinese hackers had gained access to computers possessed by government and private organizations in 103 countries, although researchers say there is no conclusive evidence China's government was behind it. Computers penetrated include those of the Dalai Lama, Tibetan exiles, organizations affiliated with the Dalai Lama in India, Brussels, London and New York, embassies, foreign ministries and other government offices, and focus was believed to be on the governments of South Asian and Southeast Asian countries. The same researchers discovered a second cyberspy network in 2010. They were able to see some of the stolen documents that included classified material about Indian missile systems, security in several Indian states, confidential embassy documents about India's relationships in West Africa, Russia and the Middle East, NATO forces travel in Afghanistan, and a years worth of the Dalai Lama's personal email. The "sophisticated" hackers were linked to universities in China. Beijing again denied involvement. In 2019, Chinese hackers posing as The New York Times, Amnesty International and other organization's reporters targeted the private office of the Dalai Lama, Tibetan Parliament members, and Tibetan nongovernmental organizations, among others. Facebook and Twitter took down a large network of Chinese bots that was spreading disinformation about the 2019–20 Hong Kong protests and a months long attack on Hong Kong media companies was traced to Chinese hackers.

Facial recognition and surveillance artificial intelligence (AI) technology developed inside China to identify Uyghurs, a Muslim minority, is now used throughout China, and despite security concerns over Chinese involvement in 5G wireless networks, is manufactured and exported worldwide by state owned China National Electronics Import & Export and Huawei to many countries, including Ecuador, Zimbabwe, Uzbekistan, Pakistan, Kenya, the United Arab Emirates, Venezuela, Bolivia, Angola and Germany. American companies and universities such as MIT and Princeton are partnering with the Rockefeller Foundation and the California Public Employees' Retirement System to fund Chinese surveillance and AI start-ups such as Hikvision, SenseTime and Megvii, which sell less expensive versions of Chinese state developed artificial intelligence surveillance systems, although this is being curtailed somewhat due to the companies being declared national security threats and human rights violators by the US, and US-China trade concerns.

In July 2020, in its annual report, Germany's domestic intelligence agency, the Federal Office for the Protection of the Constitution, warned consumers that personal data they provide to Chinese payment companies or other tech firms such as Tencent, Alibaba and others, could end up in the hands of China's government. In September 2020, a Chinese company, Shenzhen Zhenhua Data Technology came under the scanner worldwide for its big data and data mining and integration capacities and intentions related to its use. According to the information from the National Enterprise Credit Information Publicity System, which is run by State Administration for Market Regulation in China, the shareholders of Zhenhua Data Information Technology Co., Ltd. are two natural persons and one general partnership enterprise whose partners are natural persons. Wang Xuefeng, who is the chief executive and the shareholder of Zhenhua Data, has publicly boasted that he supports "hybrid warfare" through manipulation of public opinion and "psychological warfare".

=== Agencies ===
The primary agencies involved in deploying operatives overseas are the Ministry of State Security and the Intelligence Bureau of the Joint Staff Department of the Central Military Commission, both utilizing state-owned enterprises and united front groups acting as front organizations for intelligence operatives disguised as legitimate employees. The Ministry of Public Security is also involved in domestic counter-intelligence and overseas capture of fugitives, dissidents and corruption suspects through activities such as Operation Fox Hunt. The United Front Work Department is responsible for conducting political influence operations leveraging overseas Chinese diaspora and local political and economic elites while providing cover for intelligence agents.

Xinhua News Agency also collects and reports information on individuals and groups of interest for intelligence purposes. Xinhua reporters file certain internal reports (neican) to CCP leadership from secure rooms in some Chinese embassies and consulates.

==== Advanced persistent threats ====
- PLA Unit 61398 (also known as APT1)
- PLA Unit 61486 (also known as APT2)
- Buckeye (also known as APT3)
- Red Apollo (also known as APT10)
- Numbered Panda (also known as APT12)
- APT15 (also known as Vixen Panda or Ke3chang)
- DeputyDog (also known as APT17)
- Dynamite Panda or Scandium (also known as APT18, a unit of the People's Liberation Army Navy)
- Codoso Team (also known as APT19)
- Wocao (also known as APT20)
- APT22 (aka Suckfly)
- APT26 (aka Turbine Panda)
- APT 27
- PLA Unit 78020 (also known as APT30 and Naikon)
- Zirconium (also known as APT31, Violet Typhoon, or the Wuhan Xiaoruizhi Science and Technology Company)
- APT40
- Double Dragon (also known as APT41, Winnti Group, Barium, or Axiom)
- Spamouflage (also known as Dragonbridge or Storm 1376)
- Hafnium
- LightBasin (Also known as UNC1945)
- Tropic Trooper
- Volt Typhoon
- Flax Typhoon
- Charcoal Typhoon (also known as CHROMIUM)
- Salmon Typhoon (also known as SODIUM)
- Salt Typhoon (also known as GhostEmperor or FamousSparrow)
- Liminal Panda
- MirrorFace
- Mustang Panda (also known as UNC6384)
- UNC3886
- Phantom Taurus
- UNC2814

=== Relationship with the United Front ===
In 1939, Zhou Enlai espoused "nestling intelligence within the united front" while also "using the united front to push forth intelligence." According to Australian analyst Alex Joske, "the united front system provides networks, cover and institutions that intelligence agencies use for their own purposes." Joske added that "united front networks are a golden opportunity for Party's spies because they represent groups of Party-aligned individuals who are relatively receptive to clandestine recruitment."

In 2023, Chen Wenqing of the CCP's Central Political and Legal Affairs Commission directed party cadres and committees at all levels to "attach great importance to, concern themselves with, and support covert front work."

== Activity worldwide ==
=== Africa ===
==== Ethiopia ====
In January 2018, Le Monde reported that the headquarters of the African Union, which had been constructed by the China State Construction Engineering Corporation, had had its computer systems compromised between 2012 and 2017, with data from AU servers being forwarded to Shanghai. The building's computer system was subsequently removed and the AU refused a Chinese offer to configure the replacement system. Le Monde alleged that the AU had then covered up the hack to protect Chinese interests in the continent.

China and the African Union have rejected the allegations. Ethiopian Prime Minister Hailemariam Desalegn rejected the French media report, saying that he doesn't believe it. Moussa Faki Mahamat, head of the African Union Commission, said the allegations in the Le Monde's report were false. "These are totally false allegations and I believe that we are completely disregarding them."

In 2020, Japan's Computer Emergency Response Team (CERT) reported that a suspected Chinese hacking organization, "Bronze President," had hacked and extracted footage from the AU Headquarters' security cameras.

==== South Africa ====
In 2007, the People's Republic of China dispatched two armed teams to break into the Pelindaba nuclear research centre to steal technology for a pebble bed modular reactor, according to South Africa's State Security Agency. A guard at the reactor was shot in the chest during the break-in.

=== Asia ===
==== Cambodia ====
Since at least April 2017, TEMP.Periscope, an advanced persistent threat based in China, has been hacking Cambodian organizations related to the 2018 general election. Targets included the National Election Commission, the Ministry of Interior, the Ministry of Foreign Affairs and International Cooperation, the Senate of Cambodia, and the Ministry of Economy and Finance. The APT engaged in spear phishing against Monovithya Kem of the Cambodia National Rescue Party, sending messages which impersonated the Cambodian League for the Promotion and Defense of Human Rights.

==== Hong Kong ====
According to pro-democracy political groups, China has been sending spies into Hong Kong to harass dissidents and Falun Gong practitioners. In 2012, according to Oriental Daily News, a Chinese security ministry official was arrested in Hong Kong on suspicion of acting as a double agent for the United States.

In October and December 2015, five booksellers from Causeway Bay Books disappeared as part of the Causeway Bay Books disappearances. The five men, Gui Minhai, Lee Bo, Lui Bo, Cheung Jiping, and Lam Wing-kee, were allegedly kidnapped by Chinese public security bureau officials from mainland China. These extrajudicial acts were in breach of Hong Kong's judicial independence and were a result of the men publishing and distributing books containing corruption and scandals related to the senior leadership of the Chinese Communist Party.

==== India ====
The Research and Analysis Wing (R&AW) believes that China is using dozens of study centers it has set up in Nepal near the Indian border in part to spy on India.

In August 2011 a Chinese research vessel disguised as a fishing trawler was detected off the coast of Little Andaman, collecting data in a geostrategically sensitive region.

The "Luckycat" hacking campaign that targeted Japan and Tibet also targeted India. A Trojan horse was inserted into a Microsoft Word file ostensibly about India's ballistic missile defense program, allowing for the command and control servers to connect and extract information. The attacks were subsequently traced back to a Chinese graduate student from Sichuan and the Chinese government is suspected of planning the attacks.

Chinese hackers linked to the Third Technical Department of the People's Liberation Army have launched extensive and sustained hacking campaigns against the Central Tibetan Administration, based in Dharamshala.

In 2018, PLA Navy deployed a Type 815G ELINT ship in waters off Andaman and Nicobar Islands for two weeks, according to a report by Indian intelligence agencies.

In March 2019, Indian intelligence agencies told news services that China was trying to spy on Indian Navy bases located in southern India and Integrated Test Range missile testing facility located at Abdul Kalam Island. It was doing this by establishing Chinese business around these areas.

The Central Board of Direct Taxes in August 2020 caught Luo Sang, a Chinese person for operating a money laundering scheme. He reportedly employed people to gather information on the Dalai Lama's movements while simultaneously keeping an eye on pro-Tibetan individuals in Delhi and the northeastern states. In September 2020, Delhi Police arrested a journalist and accomplices under the Official Secrets Act for allegedly passing sensitive information to Chinese intelligence officers.

On 3 March 2021, the Chinese hackers attacked the Covaxin and Covishield units In India. It is also being claimed that the hackers tried to create a national blackout in the country by breaching the electricity units.

On 21 October 2022, The Tribune, an Indian English newspaper, reported that Delhi Police apprehended a Chinese female citizen hailing from Hainan province in China, and she was accused of assuming a false identity as a monk and allegedly engaging in "anti-national activities."

In February 2023, Indian police detained a Chinese national accused of spying against India under the Indian Penal Code (IPC) section 121 (waging war against the government of India) and other IPC sections, after the Chinese national visited "key installations" in Delhi, India.

On 10 May 2024, a Chinese national, was arrested by Uttar Pradesh Police and Sashastra Seema Bal for espionage activities along the India-Nepal border. Photographs of Indian Army installations and his trips to Pakistan were found on his phone.

Since China's state security laws demand enterprises to collaborate with intelligence work, India implemented software and hardware testing regulations for closed-circuit television camera manufacturers starting in April 2025.

In December 2025, Hu Congtai, a 29-year-old Chinese national, was detained in Jammu and Kashmir for allegedly violating the terms of his tourist visa by travelling to restricted areas in Ladakh and Kashmir. Authorities found that he visited strategically sensitive locations, stayed in unregistered accommodations, obtained a local SIM card, and conducted online searches related to CRPF deployments and Article 370, prompting security concerns.

==== Indonesia ====
In January 2021, Indonesian fishermen reported findings of underwater drones or gliders. This finding is thought to be related to a glider belonging to China that was previously found by fishermen around the waters of Selayar Island, South Sulawesi. Foreign media have highlighted these findings. Most of them call this incident a secret Chinese mission in Indonesian waters. The Guardian, in its Espionage rubric, details previously that a Chinese-made glider was also found by fishermen in Tanjung Pinang, Riau Islands in March 2019. Furthermore, the finding also occurred in Masalembo, East Java in January 2020.

In September 2021, Chinese hackers have breached the internal networks of at least ten Indonesian government ministries and agencies, including computers from Indonesia's primary intelligence service, Indonesian State Intelligence Agency (BIN). The intrusion, discovered by Insikt Group, the threat research division of Recorded Future, has been linked to Mustang Panda, a Chinese threat actor known for its cyber-espionage campaigns targeting the Southeast Asian region. But a spokesman of the Indonesia intelligence agency denies China hackers hacked into their computers.

In July 2022, the Indonesian Navy arrested six people, including three foreigners, two from Malaysia and one from China, on suspicion of being involved in espionage activities in North Sebatik, North Kalimantan after they were found in possession of sensitive naval base photos at the shared island, according to Indonesian media reports.

==== Japan ====
In 1976, Wang Yangran, a trader residing in Hong Kong, was arrested by the Tokyo Metropolitan Police Department on suspicion of violating the Foreign Exchange and Foreign Trade Act. Wang used Hong Kong as a base to collect information on advanced Japanese technology using connections with Chinese authorities. This incident revealed the reality that Hong Kong, then under British rule, functioned as a detour route (Hong Kong route) for goods and information to mainland China.

In 2004, a clerk at the Consulate-General of Japan in Shanghai committed suicide. The clerk had been subjected to a honey trap and blackmail by Chinese public security authorities, who coerced him to provide diplomatic classified information. The clerk took his own life leaving a suicide note, preventing the leakage of information, but the incident exposed the reality of China's forceful recruitment operations targeting diplomats.

In 2006, Yamaha Motor Company was raided for violating the Foreign Exchange and Foreign Trade Act for attempting to illegally export industrial unmanned helicopters capable of military diversion to China. The export destinations included companies deeply connected to the People's Liberation Army.

In March 2007, Yang Luchuan, a Chinese engineer at major automotive parts manufacturer Denso, stole a large amount of drawings for automotive products by downloading and taking them out without permission. Among these, about 280 types were related to state-of-the-art technology considered Denso's top secret; this Chinese engineer had returned to China multiple times during the period he was obtaining the company's data.

According to a report by Trend Micro, the "Luckycat" hacker group is engaged in cyber-espionage on targets in Japan, India and Tibet. During the 2011 Tōhoku earthquake and tsunami and nuclear meltdowns at Fukushima, the hackers inserted a Trojan virus into PDF attachments to emails being circulated containing information about radiation dosage measurements. Investigation into ownership of the command and control servers by Trend Micro and The New York Times linked the malware to Gu Kaiyuan, through QQ numbers and the alias "scuhkr". Gu was a graduate student of the Information Security Institute of Sichuan University in Chengdu and wrote his master's thesis on computer hacking. James A. Lewis of the Center for Strategic and International Studies, believes the attacks were state-sponsored. Starting in 2019, Chinese state hacking group, MirrorFace, commenced cyberattacks against Japanese governmental institutions, according to the country's National Police Agency.

Since 2010, cyberattacks against the Japanese manufacturing industry have intensified. There were a total of 42 cases since 2010, in which intellectual property such as manufacturing blueprints was stolen.

In January 2011, a French executive at Renault took out technical confidential information regarding electric vehicles developed by Nissan Motor Corporation. The French newspaper Le Figaro reported on January 7, citing multiple sources, that "the final recipient of the leaked information is China".

In 2012, Li Chunguang, a First Secretary at the Chinese Embassy in Japan, was charged with opening a bank account under a false identity. Li was alleged to be an officer of the General Staff Department of the People's Liberation Army and was suspected of collecting classified information in the agriculture, forestry, and fisheries sectors and engaging in political maneuvering. Li refused police requests to appear for questioning and returned to China using diplomatic immunity.

In 2014, a former employee of Nissan Motor Corporation illegally took out a large amount of technical data including trade secrets. He was arrested for violating the Unfair Competition Prevention Act, highlighting the seriousness of technology leakage in the automotive sector, Japan's leading industry.

From September 2016 to April 2017, a large-scale cyberattack occurred by the hacker group "Tick" related to the People's Liberation Army. The Tokyo Metropolitan Police Department referred a male system engineer, a member of the Chinese Communist Party, to prosecutors for signing a contract for the rental server used in the attack under a false name.

In 2017, an overseas police station under the Public Security Bureau of Nantong, Jiangsu Province, was established without Japan's consent. Commemorative photos taken at the time of establishment show the Nantong Municipal Party Committee Secretary and a counselor from the Chinese Embassy, suggesting it was established with official embassy recognition.

In a cyberattack on Mitsubishi Electric discovered in 2020, the involvement of Chinese hacker groups "Tick" and "BlackTech" was suspected, and defense-related information was leaked. In addition, activities by the Chinese state hacking group MirrorFace have been confirmed.

According to the Tokyo Metropolitan Police Department, the group is believed to have started cyberattacks against Japanese government agencies in 2019.

In 2020, the Ministry of Foreign Affairs' system for exchanging official telegrams containing diplomatic secrets was subjected to a Chinese cyberattack, resulting in a large-scale information leak. U.S. National Security Agency (NSA) Director Paul Nakasone and others visited Japan to meet with high-ranking Japanese government officials, and working-level officials from Japan and the U.S. discussed the response.

Regarding the persistent attacks on the Japan Aerospace Exploration Agency (JAXA) from 2023 to 2024, the National Police Agency and the National center of Incident readiness and Strategy for Cybersecurity (NISC) identified them as being committed by MirrorFace and issued an unprecedented public attribution.

In 2023, Quan Hengdao, a Chinese national and senior researcher at the National Institute of Advanced Industrial Science and Technology (AIST), was arrested for leaking fluorine compound synthesis technology to a Chinese company. Quan participated in China's "Thousand Talents Plan" and was in a state of "dual affiliation," concurrently serving as a professor at Beijing Institute of Technology.

In 2024, the Tokyo Metropolitan Police Department conducted a search of a building in Akihabara believed to be a Chinese public security overseas base.

==== Kazakhstan ====
On 19 February 2019, Kazakh counterintelligence officers arrested Konstantin Syroyezhkin, a former KGB agent, in Almaty, on charges of passing classified documents to Chinese spies. China-linked hackers have also targeted entities in Kazakhstan.

==== Malaysia ====
In 2020 Chinese hackers were implicated in the hacking of a Malaysian government official. The attacks were attributed to APT40.

==== Philippines ====
FireEye President Travis Reese has stated that the Chinese-sponsored Conference Crew, founded in 2016, has engaged in cyber-espionage against the Philippines, targeting diplomatic and national security information.

In 2020, Facebook took down a network that was part of a Chinese disinformation campaign against the Philippines. The campaign used false profiles to influence public opinion, particularly related to politics.

Following a murder in Makati City in which two Chinese PLA IDs were recovered, Philippines Senator Panfilo Lacson claimed he had received information that between 2,000 and 3,000 Chinese PLAN (People's Liberation Army Navy) members were in the Philippines. Replying on Twitter, the Chinese Embassy in Manila said the Senator was "testing the intelligence of the Philippine people", to which Lacson responded saying his information is still worth looking into, while the Armed Forces of the Philippines said it is validating the information as a "matter of serious concern."

In November 2023, the Chinese embassy in the Philippines denied allegations made by Rafael Alunan III of having sleeper cells in the country after the Philippine National Police and National Bureau of Investigation arrested Chinese nationals for illegal possession of firearms.

In 2024, former Bamban mayor Alice Guo was removed from office over questions regarding her citizenship as well her involvement in the Philippine Offshore Gaming Operator (POGO) in her town. She Zhijiang a self-confessed spy detained in Thailand named Guo as a fellow spy. Wang Fugui a cellmate of She also said that Guo's 2022 mayoral campaign was "arranged by Chinese state security". Guo's birth citizenship was eventually voided in October 2025. The Economist wrote in July 2026 that Guo was unlikely to be a spy, noting that the claims have not been backed by persuasive evidence and that the Chinese government has a negative view of scammers, who often target Chinese citizens. The newspaper added that the fact that Guo escaped to Southeast Asia rather than China was further evidence that she was not a spy.

Deng Yuanqing was arrested in January 2025 over allegations of mapping sensitive data involving military sites in Luzon.

==== Singapore ====
Huang Jing (黄靖), an academic at the Lee Kuan Yew School of Public Policy, was expelled from Singapore in 2017, reportedly for working as an agent of influence for Chinese intelligence services.

SingHealth medical data was hacked by suspected Chinese hackers around July 2018.

==== South Korea ====
FireEye claims that two hacking operations tied to the Chinese military, dubbed Tonto Team and Stone Panda/APT10, attempted to hack the South Korean Ministry of Foreign Affairs and other targets related to the deployment of THAAD. China has reportedly been engaged in economic espionage against South Korean technology companies, including Samsung Electronics and SK Hynix. In July 2024, government agencies from eight nations, including South Korea's National Intelligence Service, released a joint advisory on APT40. In 2025, SK Telecom was reported to be affected by attacks from China-based hacking group Red Menshen. In June 2026, two Chinese nationals were sentenced to prison for illegally filming the Busan Naval Base with drones. In August 2026, South Korean authorities arrested two former Chinese military servicemen over suspected spying on U.S. military communications.

==== Sri Lanka ====
In 2010, Jayalalithaa Jayaram – head of the All India Anna Dravida Munnetra Kazhagam – stated that Chinese workers, working in parts of the country devastated by the Sri Lankan Civil War were infiltrated with Chinese spies on surveillance missions targeted at India. In May 2019, Sri Lankan authorities caught the former chief of Military intelligence for allegedly acting as a Chinese mole and trying to obstruct a probe by Indian and American agencies into the Easter bombings.

==== Taiwan ====
Taiwan and China regularly accuse each other of spying.

Presidential aide Wang Jen-ping was found in 2009 to have sold nearly 100 confidential documents to China since 2007; Military intelligence officer Lo Chi-cheng was found to have been acting as a double agent in 2010 for China since 2007; Maj. Gen. Lo Hsien-che, electronic communications and information bureau chief during the administration of former President Chen Shui-bian, has been suspected of selling military secrets to mainland China since 2004.

In 2007 the Ministry of Justice Investigation Bureau stated that 500 gigabyte Maxtor Basics Personal Storage 3200 hard drives produced by Seagate Technology and manufactured in Thailand may have been modified by a Chinese subcontractor and shipped with the Virus.Win32.AutoRun.ah virus. As many as 1,800 drives sold in the Netherlands and Taiwan after August 2007 were reportedly infected with the virus, which scanned for passwords for products such as World of Warcraft and QQ and uploading them to a website in Beijing.

Zhou Hongxu (周泓旭), a graduate of National Chengchi University's MBA program, has been accused of attempting to recruit an official from the Ministry of Foreign Affairs to provide intelligence to China. Zhou was reportedly instructed by China's Taiwan Affairs Office to enroll in the university to make friends and develop a spy ring. Zhou reportedly solicited classified documents, offering trips to Japan and United States dollars in payment.

In October 2020 it was revealed that Chinese hackers had compromised the largest job bank in Taiwan, hacking the information of over five million people.

On 11 December 2020, the Ministry of Justice Investigation Bureau (MJIB) caught three Taiwanese who worked for Chinese intelligence. They were spreading propaganda about how Taiwan and the US were trying to overthrow the Thai monarchy, supporting the democracy protesters. The case is important because it is Taiwan's first Internet-related national security case, which the bureau investigated. Secondly, it is the first time Taiwan has documented that China has successfully recruited Taiwanese to work as paid online agents of its cyber army. This disinformation operation also tried to falsely portray the Milk Tea Alliance as a color revolution style American government plot.

Chinese spy balloons have overflown Taiwan.

In August 2022, during Speaker of the House Nancy Pelosi's visit to Taiwan, a TV screen at a Taiwan Railway Ministration (TRA) station displayed a message referring to Pelosi as an "old witch" in simplified Chinese characters (official characters in mainland China), while TV screens at multiple 7-Elevens began referring to her as a "warmonger." China was suspected of hacking the TRA signs and Taiwan 7-Eleven to mock Pelosi.

In March 2023, Taiwan prosecutors charged two former officials with violating the national security law by organizing meetings between former senior military officers and Chinese intelligence personnel. Retired rear admiral Hsia Fu-hsiang and former lawmaker Lo Chih-ming began their espionage after being recruited by the Chinese military and United Front Work Department. Each faces up to five years in jail if convicted.

In August 2023, Taiwan's Ministry of National Defense detained a lieutenant colonel, Hsieh, for leaking military secrets to China. Hsieh and several others were suspected of having been recruited by China to provide China with national defense secrets and other information. Hsieh is also suspected of developing a spy organization of current and retired military personnel to collect intelligence for China.

In April 2026, Chu Cheng-Chi, a former aide and DPP primary candidate for Taipei city council, was indicted for allegedly leaking sensitive legislative information to China.

In August 2026, German journalist Jürgen Kremb stated that he was followed by a female Chinese Intelligence operative on Alishan in 2015, which the MJIB confirmed.

===== Military espionage =====
In May 2017, Major Wang Hung-ju, a retired military police officer assigned to the National Security Bureau, was indicted on charges of spying for the People's Republic of China.

Army Major General Hsieh Chia-kang, deputy commander of Matsu Defense Command, has been accused of providing intelligence to China, having been recruited by retired army colonel Hsin Peng-sheng.

In January 2018, it was reported that the Taipei District Prosecutor's Office is investigating if classified information regarding the Airborne Special Service Company was passed on to Zhou Hongxu (周泓旭), who was already convicted for violating the National Security Act. In March 2018, a retired colonel was charged with breaching the National Security Act by the Kaohsiung District Prosecutors' Office, which alleged that the colonel shared classified personal information and planned to develop a spy ring in Taiwan. In April 2018, Hung Chin-hsi (洪金錫), a Macau-born businessman, was accused of developing a spy ring in the Ministry of Justice, on behalf of China. Captain Zhen Xiaojiang (鎮小江) was convicted in 2015 of recruiting Taiwanese military officers as part of a spy ring on behalf of China, including Army Major-General Hsu Nai-chuan (許乃權). Zhen sent intelligence regarding Taiwan's radar installations and Dassault Mirage 2000 fighters to China. He was deported to Hong Kong in July 2018.

In 2022, Taipei District Prosecutors Office charged retired major general Chien and retired lieutenant colonel Wei for developing a spy network for China. They were accused of working for a Hong Konger named Tse, who would visit Taiwan to recruit retired officers and reach out to those on active duty. Chien and Wei tried unsuccessfully to recruit Chang Che-ping, who was a deputy minister at the ROC Ministry of National Defense before serving as a strategic adviser to President Tsai Ing-wen. Chang was probed as a defendant last year but later renamed as a witness.

From January 2022 to June 2024, the Taiwanese government reported over 1,700 instances of Chinese intelligence trying to recruit Taiwanese military personnel.

In October 2026, the Taiwan High Prosecutors Office indicted four people including a retired military police captain for allegedly helping Chinese contacts pay Taiwanese service members for leaking classified military information. Retired captain Yu Cheng-yu allegedly collected cryptocurrency on behalf of Chinese contacts, converted it into cash and distributed payments to service members. He allegedly earned NT$430,403 from the scheme.

===== Economic espionage =====
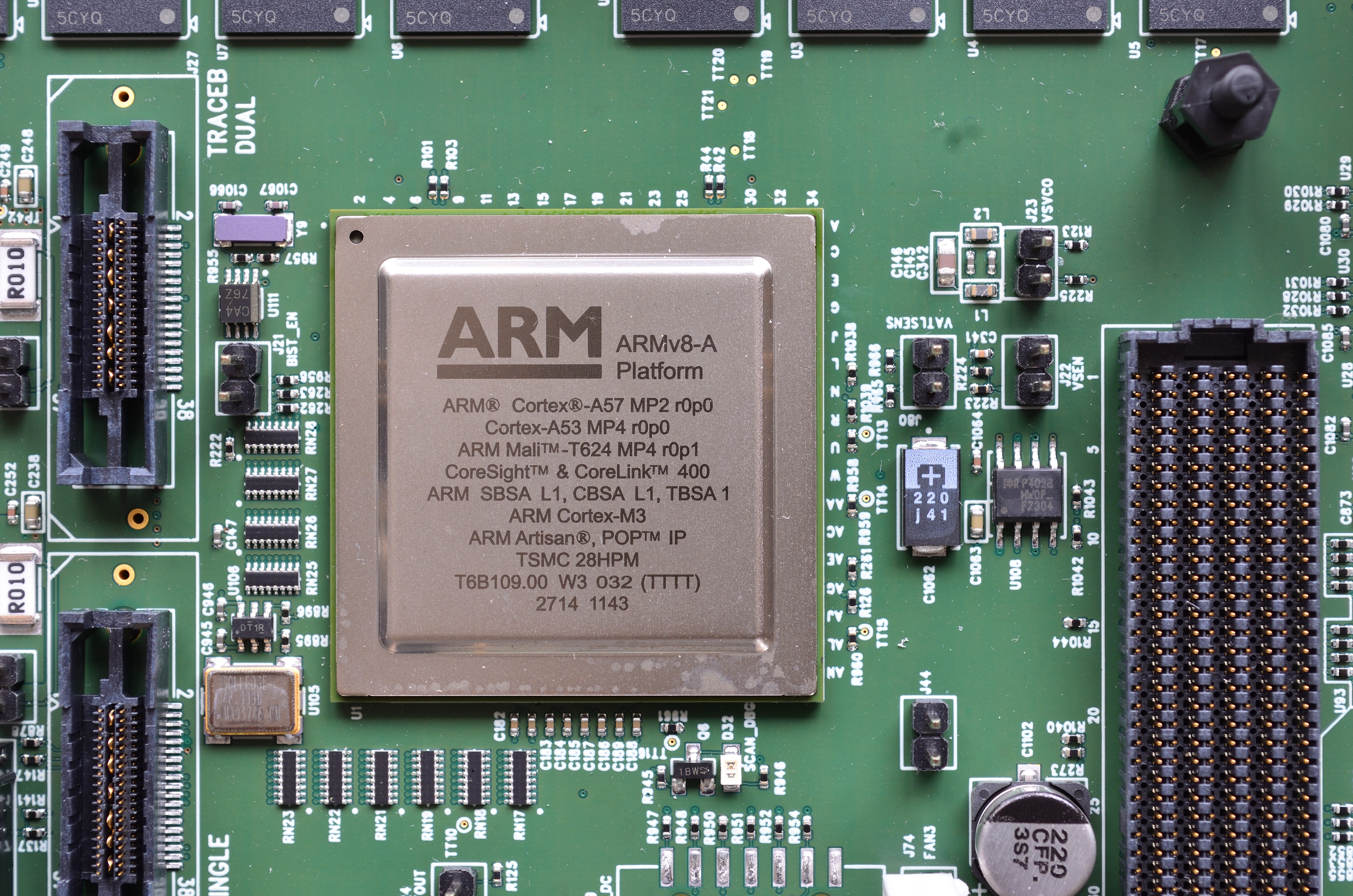
Integrated circuit made in Taiwan

The Wall Street Journal reported that Taiwan has been "ground zero" for economic espionage related to its integrated circuit fabrication industry. In a review of ten prosecutions for technology-related intellectual property infringement in Taiwan, WSJ found that nine of those cases involved technology transfer to China. An employee of Nanya Technology Corp. allegedly stole designs for dynamic random-access memory (DRAM) on behalf of Tsinghua Holdings. Hsu Chih-Peng, an engineer for Taiwan Semiconductor Manufacturing Co., allegedly stole microchip designs after being solicited by the Chinese government-owned Shanghai Huali Microelectronics Corporation.

According to Taiwanese prosecutors, engineer Wang Yongming (on behalf of Fujian Jinhua Integrated Circuit) engaged in espionage to steal Micron Technology microchip designs via the Taiwanese company UMC. Micron alleges that UMC hired Micron's engineers, asking them to steal files on advanced memory chips. The files Wang allegedly stole were said to be production secrets, including testing procedures related to metallization, and the DR25nmS design protocol.

==== Vietnam ====
According to the security research firm FireEye, Chinese hackers are suspected of targeting Vietnamese government and corporate targets. The hacking group, designated Conimes, phished the targets and delivered malware via a pre-2012 version of Microsoft Word.

=== Europe ===
According to the cyber-security firm Area 1, hackers working for the People's Liberation Army Strategic Support Force compromised the COREU network used for communication by the European Union (EU), allowing it to access thousands of low-classified documents and diplomatic cables.

According to a 2019 report released by the European External Action Service, an estimated 250 MSS spies were operating in Brussels.

In a July 2021 joint statement with NATO, the individual core Anglosphere/Five Eyes nations, and Japan, the EU accused the Ministry of State Security, along with MSS-contracted criminal hackers, of perpetrating several cyberattacks, most notably the 2021 Microsoft Exchange Server data breach. While some attacks were for-profit ransomware incidents by contracted hacker gangs, EU foreign policy commissioner Josep Borrell said the hacking was "for the purpose of intellectual property theft and espionage."

In March 2026, China was reported to have used fake LinkedIn profiles to gather sensitive information from NATO and EU staff, targeting employees through fictitious recruitment accounts. The operation, attributed to the MSS, involved posing as recruiters to solicit paid reports and classified data.

In July 2026, Belgian authorities arrested a Canadian former NATO intern on suspicion of espionage. Reuters and BBC later reported that Belgian investigators suspected the former NATO intern had been spying for China.

==== Belgium ====
In 2005, the Katholieke Universiteit Leuven in Leuven was reported to be the center for a group of Chinese students in Europe conducting industrial espionage, operating under a front organization called the Chinese Students' and Scholars' Association of Leuven. In 2005 a leading figure of the Association defected to Belgium, providing information to the Belgian State Security Service on hundreds of spies engaged in economic espionage across Europe. The group had no obvious links to Chinese diplomats and was focused on getting moles into laboratories and universities in the Netherlands, Britain, Germany, France and Belgium. The People's Daily, an organ of the Central Committee of the Chinese Communist Party, dismissed the reports as fabrications triggered by fears of China's economic development.

In 2008, Belgian Justice Minister Jo Vandeurzen accused the Chinese government of electronic espionage against the government of Belgium, while Foreign Minister Karel De Gucht informed the Belgian Federal Parliament that Chinese agents hacked his ministry. The espionage is possibly linked to Belgium hosting the headquarters of NATO and the European Union.

In February 2019, a report was released by European External Action Service which estimated that there were 250 Chinese Ministry of State Security spies operating in Brussels, the capital of the European Union.

On 15 December 2023, a joint investigation by Financial Times, Der Spiegel and Le Monde revealed that former Vlaams Belang senator Frank Creyelman accepted bribes from Ministry of State Security for three years to influence discussions within the European Union. Subsequently, Vlaams Belang expelled him from the party. His brother, Steven Creyelman, also MP for the VB, is also linked to this case. Belgian Prime Minister Alexander De Croo referred to China as a "sometimes very hostile" country following the allegations.

In April 2024, the Belgian Foreign Ministry summoned the Chinese envoy after reports emerged that Chinese spies (APT31) hacked the laptops of key lawmakers such as the head of the Belgian Foreign Affairs Committee and former prime minister Guy Verhofstadt. In April 2025, Belgian media reported that Chinese intelligence attempted to coerce the mayor of Huy, Eric Dosogne, in 2020 to spy on Samuel Cogolati, a leader of Ecolo and prominent member of the Inter-Parliamentary Alliance on China. In October 2025, it was reported that Chinese state-backed advanced persistent threat group Mustang Panda had targeted Belgian and other European diplomats as part of a cyber-espionage campaign. In September 2026, Belgian authorities arrested a Chinese national suspected of espionage involving semiconductor technology.

In May 2026, Belgian authorities detained a senior researcher at semiconductor company BelGaN on suspicion of industrial espionage. The person is being held in prison for trial. Belgian prosecutors alleged that he transferred trade secrets concerning gallium nitride semiconductor production to China.

==== Denmark ====
In June 2023, Bloomberg News reported that Huawei engaged in espionage against the Danish telecom group (TDC) based in Copenhagen, Denmark. This espionage aimed to gain an advantage in their bid against the Swedish telecommunications company Ericsson for a lucrative 5G network contract valued at CHF 175 million ($198 million) to upgrade Denmark's cellular network.

==== Estonia ====
In March 2021, Estonian scientist Tarmo Kõuts was convicted of spying for China. According to the Estonian Internal Security Service, Kõuts was recruited in 2018 by China's Intelligence Bureau of the Joint Staff Department of the Central Military Commission, and was arrested on 9 September 2020. Kõuts was paid approximately €17,000 by his handlers. Kõuts worked for the Maritime Institute of Tallinn Technical University, and was also a member of the Scientific Committee of the Estonian Ministry of Defence and the NATO Undersea Research Centre.

==== Finland ====
According to the security research firm F5, Chinese hackers launched widespread attacks against Finnish Internet of things computers before the 2018 Russia–United States Summit in Helsinki.

In March 2021, the Finnish government implicated the China-linked hacking group APT31 in a hack of the Finnish Parliament. In July that same year, as part of a joint EU/NATO/US/UK statement on Chinese-backed hacking campaigns (see 2021 Microsoft Exchange Server data breach), the British National Cyber Security Centre joined in accusing China-linked hacking groups of being behind the Finnish Parliament hack.

==== France ====
There have been several incidents of suspected Chinese spies in France. This includes Shi Pei Pu, a Chinese opera singer from Beijing who convinced a French diplomat that he was a woman and spied on France.

French media also portrayed Li Li Whuang (李李), a 22-year-old Chinese intern at car parts maker Valeo, as an industrial spy. Both the French prosecution and Valeo refuted media claims of spying and the case was later considered to be a psychosis. Li Li was ultimately convicted of violating the confidentiality clause of her contract and served two months in prison, but was allowed to continue her doctoral studies at the University of Technology of Compiègne.

Two French intelligence operatives, identified only as Henri M and Pierre-Marie H, were accused of communicating classified information to China. Henri M was reportedly the Beijing station chief for the Directorate-General for External Security.

According to reporting by Le Figaro, the General Directorate for Internal Security and Directorate-General for External Security believe that Chinese spies have used LinkedIn to target thousands of business and government officials as potential sources of information.

In 2011, a Chinese cyberattack against Airbus Astrium (now ArianeGroup) occurred, targeting technical specifications and test results of M51 SLBM.

In December 2018, experts from the DGSI and ANSSI discovered a "sophisticated" supply chain attack targeting Airbus. The pattern of the attack has been described as typical of APT10 although unusually sophisticated. It is suspected that the attack was motivated by economic warfare to benefit the development of the domestic Chinese C919 airliner.

In 2019, the admiral Morio de l'Isle warned the National Assembly about a high number of marriages between Chinese women and French servicemen in Brest, which host the general staff of the Strategic Oceanic Force, responsible for the sea-based French nuclear deterrence, and located next to Île Longue, the home base of French SSBN. He also notified of an "increasingly strong" Chinese presence around VLF military transmission center across France citing the example of the creation of "sino-european hub" funded by the investment company of Beijing Municipality in a remote town near the HWU transmitter. This choice was described by a local deputy as "troubling".

In December 2020, Huawei announced it will open its first large factory outside China in France next to the border with Germany. National and local newspapers have quickly expressed national security concerns about the location of the factory, situated between DRM headquarters, multiple electronic warfare, intelligence and transmission regiments, as well as about the company itself. The US Consul of Strasbourg met with the local mayor.

In July 2021, the ANSSI issued a security alert about a "large intrusion campaign impacting numerous French entities" described as "especially virulent" using the mode of operation of APT31. Two weeks later, Minister of the Armed Forces Florence Parly at the International Cybersecurity Forum suggested the emergence of "a new cold war in cyberspace [...] without the corresponding restraint. [...] There is no red phone in the cyber" and warned "we could be confronted to quickly and uncontrollably escalating situations with unseen crisis and unpredictable domino effects".

In March 2023, Taiwan's Overseas Community Affairs Council (OCAC) announced that a Chinese overseas police station in France engaged in cyberattacks against an OCAC language school in France.

A former employee of Beijing's Academy of Science and Technology and the president of Stahd Europe—a subsidiary of the Chinese telecommunications company Emposat—was reportedly involved in activities that raised national security concerns in France. French intelligence agents from the Defence Intelligence and Security Directorate (DRSD) identified a suspicious satellite dish installed on a balcony near agricultural silos. Unlike standard television dishes, the equipment was outfitted with specialized components directed at the CNES (Centre National d'Études Spatiales) ground stations in Issus-Aussaguel. These ground stations manage observation satellites developed by Airbus and Thales. The interception of signals from these satellites was considered a serious national security threat, prompting an investigation into possible espionage.

In June 2026, Le Monde reported that French counterintelligence services had broken up a network of nine Chinese police stations operating in France. French authorities said the sites operated under China's Ministry of Public Security and were used to monitor the Chinese diaspora, identify dissidents, collect intelligence, and recruit informants.

==== Germany ====
According to reporting in Süddeutsche Zeitung, China has been soliciting information from members of the Bundestag, including offering €30,000 for insider information from one parliamentarian.

Between August and September 2007 Chinese hackers were suspected of using Trojan horse spyware on various government computers, including those of the Chancellory, the Ministry of Economics and Technology, and the Ministry of Education and Research. Germans officials believe Trojan viruses were inserted in Microsoft Word and PowerPoint files, and approximately 160 gigabytes of data were siphoned to Guangzhou, Lanzhou and Beijing via South Korea, on instructions from the People's Liberation Army.

The Federal Ministry of the Interior estimates that Chinese economic espionage could be costing Germany between 20 and 50 billion euros annually. Spies are reportedly targeting mid- and small-scale companies that do not have as strong security regimens as larger corporations. Berthold Stoppelkamp, head of the Working Group for Economic Security (ASW), stated that German companies had a poor security culture making espionage easier, exacerbated by the absence of a "strong, centralized" police command. Walter Opfermann, a counter-intelligence expert for the state of Baden-Württemberg, claimed that China is using extremely sophisticated electronic attacks capable of endangering portions of critical German infrastructure, having gathered sensitive information through techniques such as phone hacking and Trojan emails. In November 2018, German prosecutors in Cologne charged a former employee of Lanxess for engaging in industrial espionage on behalf of a Chinese copycat company.

Germany suspects China of spying both on German corporations and on Uyghur expatriates living in the country. In 2011, a 64-year-old German man was charged with spying on Uyghurs in Munich between April 2008 and October 2009. Munich is a center for expatriate Uyghurs, and in November 2009 members of the Federal Criminal Police Office arrested four Chinese nationals on charges of spying on Uyghurs. In 2007 Chinese diplomat Ji Wumin left Germany after being observed meeting with individuals engaged in surveillance of Munich Uyghurs, and German investigators suspect China is coordinating espionage activities out of its Munich consulate in the Neuhausen district.

In 2012, EADS (Airbus) and steel maker ThyssenKrupp were attacked by Chinese hackers. ThyssenKrupp described the attack as "massive" and "especially qualitative".

In 2016, ThyssenKrupp underwent an "organized, highly professional hacking attack" conducted "with state backing and the best attack techniques" whose aim was "to steal technological know-how and research". The group stated to have successfully repealed the attack after a "6 months long defensive battle". Some information was obtained by the hackers but critical divisions concerning blast furnace, power stations and submarines have reportedly not been affected. The timing of the attacks suggest that attackers are based in China or southeast Asia.

In 2017, the Federal Office for the Protection of the Constitution (BfV) published information alleging that Chinese intelligence services had created fake social media profiles on sites such as LinkedIn, using them to gather information on German politicians and government officials. The Verfassungsschutz had previously warned that Chinese intelligence officers are making use of social networking sites such as LinkedIn and XING to recruit informants. Lu Kang of the Ministry of Foreign Affairs denied the allegations.

In 2019, an investigation led by the Bayerischer Rundfunk uncovered that a hacker group called Winnti had attacked twelve major companies including six German DAX-traded companies: Bayer AG, BASF, Siemens, Henkel, Covestro. The Kapersky Lab first uncovered Winnti in 2011 after it infected the German company Gameforge and has been highly active ever since. An IT security expert with whom they have worked said that "any DAX corporation that hasn't been attacked by Winnti must have done something wrong". This group has also been attributed the responsibility of the 2016 ThyssenKrupp hacking attack.

We can, based on many, many indicators, say with high confidence that Winnti is being directed by the Chinese [government].

— Dror-John Röcher (German Cyber Security Organization [DCSO])

In October 2024, Germany arrests Chinese woman Yaqi X for passing defense info to China via EU lawmaker Maximilian Krah’s Chinese aide Jian Guo.

In January 2025, German prosecutors indicted three individuals suspected of spying for China by gathering information on military technology for China's Ministry of State Security. The German Federal Criminal Police Office (BKA) arrested Herwig F., Ina F. and Thomas R., in Düsseldorf and Bad Homburg in April 2024.

In April 2025, a Chinese man, Jian Guo, who worked for a prominent German far-right lawmaker Maximilian Krah in the European Parliament was charged with spying for China for more than four years.

In May 2026, German police arrested a married couple named Xuejun C. and Hua S. in Munich accused of spying for China by collecting sensitive information on aerospace, AI, and other technologies with possible military use. Prosecutors said the pair built contacts with German researchers and universities on behalf of Chinese intelligence.

In October 2026, Germany's former intelligence chief August Hanning was arrested on suspicion of espionage, with Der Spiegel reporting his longstanding contacts with former Chinese major general Wang Jianzheng. Hanning was suspected of sharing confidential information with foreign intelligence agents after retiring in 2005 and becoming an independent security consultant.

==== Lithuania ====
Lithuanian intelligence agencies have claimed that China is engaged in an "increasingly aggressive" campaign of espionage, which includes "attempts to recruit Lithuanian citizens". Darius Jauniskis, Director of the State Security Department of Lithuania, has cautioned against a potential threat posed by Huawei telecommunications equipment.

==== Norway ====
Hackers working as part of APT10, on behalf of the Chinese government, hacked Norwegian business software provider Visma, reportedly to gain access to the information on the company's customers. Beginning on 30 August 2018, APT10 used a malware program dubbed Trochilus and accessed a backdoor, and then proceeded to use WinRAR and cURL to exfiltrate data from Visma to a Dropbox account. Norwegian parliamentary email accounts were breached by Chinese state hackers during the 2021 Microsoft Exchange Server data breach.

In July 2024, Norwegian authorities arrested a suspected spy for China.

In May 2026, the Norwegian Police Security Service arrested a Chinese national on suspicion of attempting to illegally obtain satellite data.

In September 2026, Chinese-made cars filmed sensitive information during a Norwegian military exercise at the Oslo airport. The recordings showed who was getting in and out of the cars, the routes, and the codes used to open gates to military facilities. Rental vehicles, including Deepal cars made by Changan, were supplied to the military by Hertz Norge, which is indirectly owned by Geely.

==== Poland ====
On 19 April 2009, Stefan Zielonka, a non-commissioned officer serving as a cipher operator for the Military Information Services and later the Military Intelligence Service, mysteriously disappeared. Following his disappearance, some speculated that Zielonka may have worked for Russian intelligence or defected to China, where his expertise in cryptography and knowledge of NATO communication systems could have provided valuable information. Conversely, others suggested that Zielonka struggled with depression and personal issues, though this was disputed by some. On 27 April 2010, Zielonka's body was found in an advanced state of decomposition on the banks of the Vistula River, with a rope hanging from a nearby tree and documents bearing his name. Some speculated that his death may have been staged. Eventually, DNA testing of four bone fragments confirmed the body was his, and investigators ruled out third-party involvement. However, the case and its investigation remained shrouded in numerous unresolved and puzzling circumstances.

In April 2018, a former member of the Parliament of Poland for Samoobrona, Mateusz Piskorski, was charged with espionage on behalf of Russia and China.

In January 2019, the Huawei sales director for Poland, identified as Weijing Wang (a.k.a. "Stanislaw Wang") was arrested, along with a former senior agent of the Agencja Bezpieczeństwa Wewnętrznego (ISA) named Piotr Durbajlo, on suspicion of espionage. Wang was educated at the Beijing Foreign Studies University and studied Polish in Łódź, and subsequently worked as a cultural attaché at the Chinese consulate in Gdańsk. Wang joined Huawei's Enterprise Business Group in 2017. Durbajlo worked at the Military University of Technology, working on telecommunications security projects. After retiring from the ISA, he began working as a consultant for Orange Polska.

==== Russia ====
In December 2007, Igor Reshetin, the Chief Executive of Tsniimash-Export, and three researchers were sentenced to prison for passing on dual-purpose technology to the Chinese. Analysts speculated that the leaked technology could help China develop improved missiles and accelerate the Chinese space program. In September 2010, the Russian Federal Security Service detained two scientists working at the Baltic State Technical University in Saint Petersburg. The two are charged with passing on classified information to China, possibly through the Harbin Engineering University. Russia has been a significant target for China linked hackers.

In February 2020, the FSB detained Valery Mitko, President of Russia's Arctic Academy of Sciences, on charges of providing classified information related to underwater detection of submarines to Chinese intelligence operatives. In 2022, Mitko died under a house arrest challenged as being extralegal.

In June 2025, The New York Times reported that a leaked internal FSB memo raised concerns about China with respect to industrial espionage of sensitive Russian technologies. Information on Russia's weaponry has increasingly been targeted by advanced persistent threats emanating from China.

==== Turkey ====
China has engaged in espionage campaigns in order to monitor Uyghurs in Turkey that have involved coercion and sophisticated cyber-espionage measures. In February 2024, Turkey arrested six individuals suspected of spying on Uyghurs in the country on behalf of China's intelligence service. In May 2025, the Turkish National Intelligence Organization (MIT) reportedly dismantled a Chinese cyber-espionage cell in Istanbul, accused of using ghost base stations to collect communication data and user information and conduct surveillance of Turkish public officials and Uyghur Turks.

==== Switzerland ====
According to reports in Neue Zürcher Zeitung, Chinese intelligence services have attempted to recruit Swiss university staff and researchers using LinkedIn. In 2023, Swiss authorities raided a Chinese-owned hotel in Unterbäch suspected of operating a spy ring directed at a nearby airfield hosting Lockheed Martin F-35 Lightning II jets.

==== Sweden ====
Babur Maihesuti, a Uyghur who became a Swedish citizen was arrested for spying on the Uyghur refugee communities in Sweden, Norway, Germany and the United States, and ultimately sentenced for illegal espionage activity. In April 2018, Sweden charged Dorjee Gyantsan, a 49-year-old Tibetan refugee, with spying on Tibetan dissidents and refugees in Sweden between July 2015 and February 2017. Gyantsan is accused of collecting information on Tibetan refugees in Sweden, and then passing that information on to Chinese officials in Finland and Poland. Gyantsan was arrested upon returning from Warsaw, carrying $6,000 in cash.

==== United Kingdom ====
The government of the People's Republic of China (PRC) and various organs of the Chinese Communist Party (CCP) have conducted surveillance and espionage in the United Kingdom, according to top UK national security officials such as the head of its domestic intelligence agency MI5. UK officials, including experts at its MI5, have long been fearful that the PRC could shut down businesses in the nation with cyberattacks and spy equipment embedded in computer and telecommunications equipment.

==== Vatican City ====
According to an investigation by Recorded Future, Chinese hackers broke into the computer networks of the Vatican and the Holy See's Study Mission to China, including by placing malware in what appeared to be a letter from Cardinal Secretary of State Pietro Parolin. In the weeks after the investigation was published the hackers continued to operate on Vatican networks, by November 2020 the group targeting the Vatican had changed their tactics to avoid detection but were discovered by researchers from the firm Proofpoint.

=== North America ===
==== Canada ====
Newspapers have estimated that China may have up to 1,000 spies in Canada. The head of the Canadian Security Intelligence Service Richard Fadden in a television interview was assumed to have implied that various Canadian politicians at provincial and municipal levels had ties to Chinese intelligence. In an interview, he claimed that some politicians were under the influence of a foreign government, but he withdrew the statement a few days later. It was assumed by Chinese groups in Canada, and others, that he was referring to China because in the same interview he stressed the high level of Chinese spying in Canada, however Fadden did not say specifically which country these politicians were under the influence of. His statement was withdrawn a few days later.

In 2005, Canadian businessman Joe Wang stated his belief that threatening letters he received after broadcasting programs about alleged human rights abuses in China were from the Chinese consulate; one of the envelopes contained boric acid.

In 2012 Mark Bourrie, an Ottawa-based freelance journalist, stated that the State Council-run Xinhua News Agency asked him to collect information on the Dalai Lama through their Ottawa bureau chief, Dacheng Zhang, by exploiting his journalistic access to the Parliament of Canada. Bourrie stated that he was asked to write for Xinhua in 2009 and sought advice from the Canadian Security Intelligence Service (CSIS), but was ignored. Bourrie was asked to collect information on the Sixth World Parliamentarians' Convention on Tibet at the Ottawa Convention Centre, although Xinhua had no intention of writing a story on the proceedings. Bourrie stated that at that point "We were there under false pretenses, pretending to be journalists but acting as government agents." Xinhua collects extensive information on Tibetan and Falun Gong dissidents in Canada, and is accused of being engaged in espionage by Chinese defector Chen Yonglin and Reporters Without Borders.

On 1 December 2013, Lloyd's Register employee Qing Quentin Huang was arrested and charged with violating the Security of Information Act, for allegedly communicating classified information on the federal shipbuilding strategy to China. Huang reportedly contacted the Chinese Embassy in Ottawa in an attempt to pass on secrets, which was detected by the Canadian Security Intelligence Service, who in turn alerted the Royal Canadian Mounted Police.

Between 2006 and 2010 Yang Wang, a Chinese immigrant to Canada, admitted to providing intelligence to the Ministry of State Security, including on the activities of Falun Gong.

Around June 2014, the National Research Council was reportedly penetrated by Chinese state-sponsored hackers.

In 2022, Yuesheng Wang, a researcher at Hydro-Québec, was arrested and charged with violating the Security of Information Act, for allegedly obtaining trade secrets and filing patents in connection with Chinese universities and publishing papers without the permission of Hydro-Québec. He is also charged with fraud for obtaining trade secrets, unauthorized use of a computer and breach of trust by a public officer. His crimes were allegedly committed between February 2018 and October 2022.

==== United States ====
I think it's more than likely we're going to end up, if we end up in a war – a real shooting war with a major power – it's going to be as a consequence of a cyber breach of great consequence and it's increasing exponentially, the capabilities. — President Biden, at the Office of the Director of National Intelligence on 27 July 2021, in front of the U.S. intelligence community

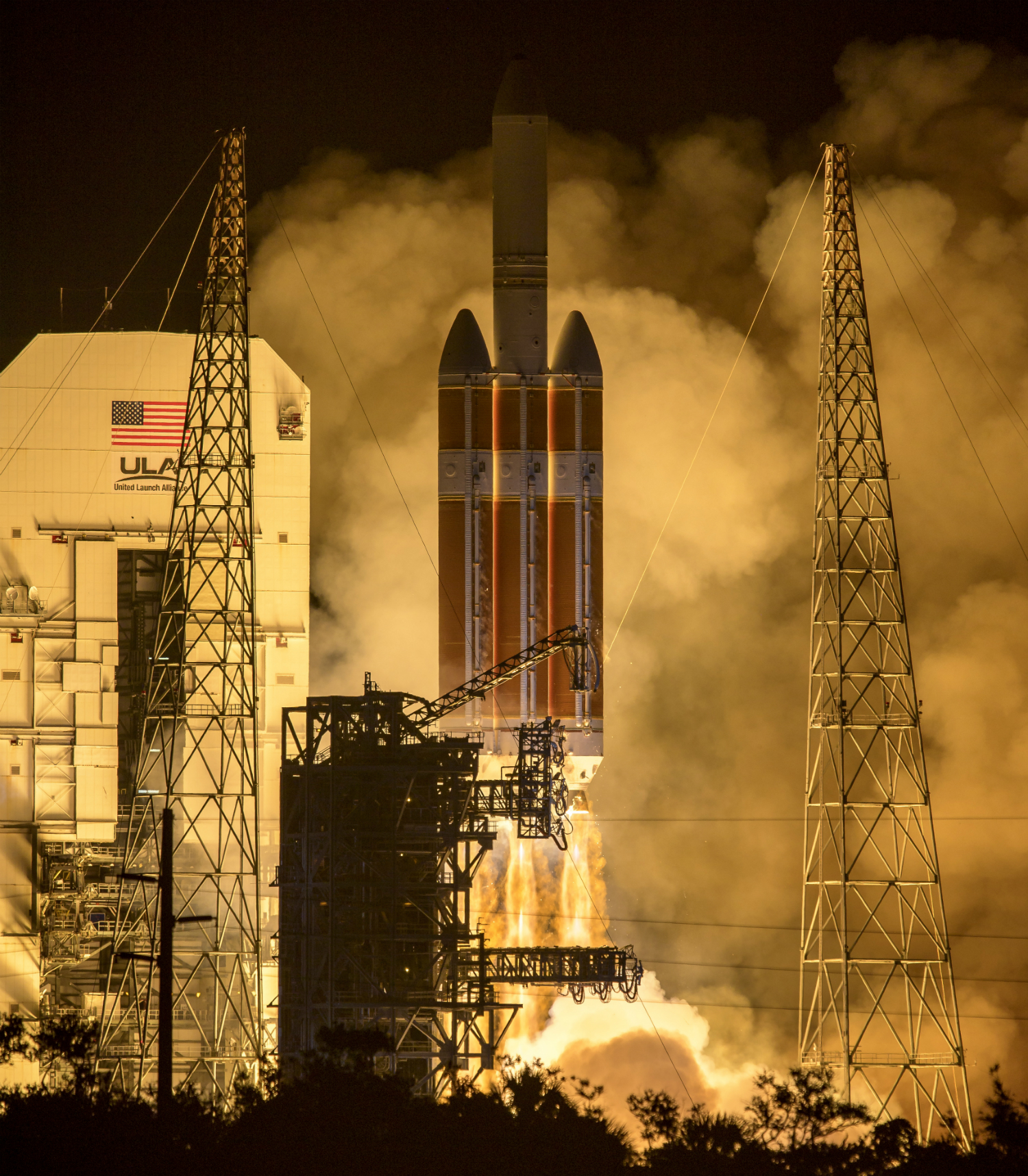
Delta IV Heavy in 2018

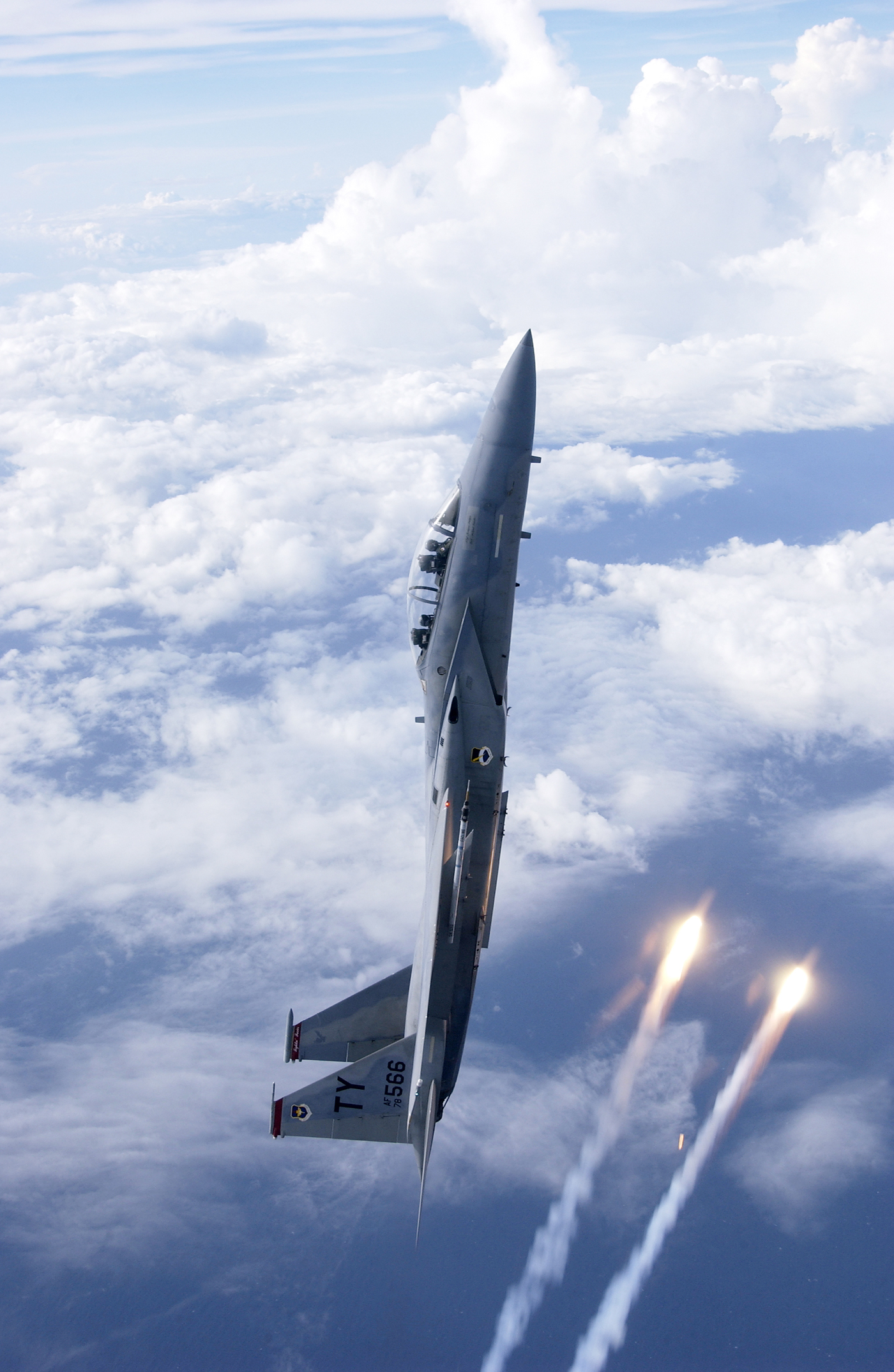
F-15 Eagle in 2004

China is suspected of having a long history of espionage in the United States against military and industrial secrets, often resorting to the exploitation of commercial entities and a network of scientific, academic, and business contacts. Several U.S. citizens have been convicted for spying for China. Naturalized citizen Dongfan Chung, an engineer working with Boeing, was the first person convicted under the Economic Espionage Act of 1996. Chung is suspected of having passed on classified information on designs including the Delta IV rocket, F-15 Eagle, B-52 Stratofortress and the CH-46 and CH-47 helicopters.

The U.S. Department of Justice investigation into the fund-raising activities had uncovered evidence that Chinese agents sought to direct contributions from foreign sources to the Democratic National Committee (DNC) before the 1996 presidential campaign. The Chinese embassy in Washington, D.C. was used to coordinate contributions to the DNC.

Taiwanese-American scientist Wen Ho Lee (born in Nantou, Taiwan 21 December 1939) was accused and investigated on the grounds of espionage in 1999 but was acquitted of all charges except for mishandling classified data.

In November 2005 the United States arrested four people in Los Angeles on suspicion of being involved in a Chinese spy ring.

In 2008 the Chinese government was accused of secretly copying information from the laptop of Commerce Secretary Carlos Gutierrez during a trade mission to Beijing to gain information on American corporations. The allegations were subsequently dismissed by Qin Gang, a spokesman for the Ministry of Foreign Affairs of the People's Republic of China.

In 2009 China was suspected of stealing terabytes of design data for the F-35 Joint Strike Fighter from defense contractor Lockheed Martin's computers. In 2012, a Chinese version, the J-31, appeared to rival the F-35.

China's espionage and cyberattacks against the US government and business organizations are a major concern, according to the seventh annual report (issued September 2009) to the US Congress of the United States–China Economic and Security Review Commission. "Although attribution is a problem in cyber attacks, the scale and coordination of the attacks strongly indicates Chinese state involvement", said commission vice chairman Larry Wortzel. "In addition to harming U.S. interests, Chinese human and cyber espionage activities provide China with a method for leaping forward in economic, technological, and military development." The report cited that the number of cyberattacks from China against the US Department of Defense computer systems had grown from 43,880 in 2007 to 54,640 in 2008, a nearly 20 percent increase. Reuters reported that the Commission found that the Chinese government has placed many of its computer network responsibilities under the direction of the People's Liberation Army, and was using the data mostly for military purposes. In response, China slammed the report as "full of prejudice", and warning it could damage China-US relations. "We advise this so-called commission not to always view China through tinted glasses", Foreign Ministry spokesman Qin Gang said.

In June 2015, the United States Office of Personnel Management (OPM) announced that it had been the target of a data breach targeting the records of as many as four million people. Later, FBI Director James Comey put the number at 18 million. The Washington Post has reported that the attack originated in China, citing unnamed government officials. James Comey said: "It is a very big deal from a national security perspective and from a counterintelligence perspective. It's a treasure trove of information about everybody who has worked for, tried to work for, or works for the United States government."

Voice of America reported in April 2020 that "U.S. intelligence agencies concluded the Chinese hackers meddled in both the 2016 and 2018 elections" and "Internet security researchers say there have already been signs that China-allied hackers have engaged in so-called 'spear-phishing' attacks on American political targets" ahead of the 2020 United States elections.

In 2019, two Chinese nationals were indicted for the Anthem medical data breach. About 80 million company records were hacked, stoking fears that the copied data could be used for identity theft. In February 2020, the United States government indicted members of China's PLA for hacking into Equifax and plundering sensitive data as part of a massive heist that also included stealing trade secrets. Private records of more than 145 million Americans were compromised in the 2017 Equifax data breach.

In July 2020, FBI Director Christopher A. Wray called China the "greatest long-term threat" to the United States. He said that "the FBI is now opening a new China-related counterintelligence case every 10 hours. Of the nearly 5,000 active counterintelligence cases currently under way across the country, almost half are related to China."

The greatest long-term threat to our nation’s information and intellectual property, and to our economic vitality, is the counterintelligence and economic espionage threat from China. It’s a threat to our economic security—and by extension, to our national security...It’s the people of the United States who are the victims of what amounts to Chinese theft on a scale so massive that it represents one of the largest transfers of wealth in human history. We’ve now reached the point where the FBI is opening a new China-related counterintelligence case about every 10 hours. Of the nearly 5,000 active FBI counterintelligence cases currently underway across the country, almost half are related to China. — Director of the FBI Christopher Wray, Remarks at the Hudson Institute (July 7, 2020)

In July 2020, the United States Department of Justice indicted two Chinese hackers with global computer intrusion campaign targeting intellectual property and confidential business information, including COVID-19 research. It alleged that the two hackers worked with the Guangdong State Security Department of the Ministry of State Security (China).

In a July 2021 joint statement with NATO, the EU, and other Western nations, the US accused the Ministry of State Security of perpetrating several cyberattacks, including the 2021 Microsoft Exchange Server data breach. However, it also noted that several attacks were for-profit ransomware attacks by non-government hackers contracted by the MSS for non-intelligence purposes. Additionally, the U.S. Justice Department charged four Chinese nationals accused of working for the MSS with a hacking campaign targeting government, academic, and private institutions; the individuals were each charged with one count of conspiracy to commit computer fraud and conspiracy to commit economic espionage.

In November 2022, Yanjun Xu, the first Chinese government intelligence officer ever to be extradited to the United States to stand trial was sentenced to 20 years in prison for espionage crimes, attempting to steal trade secrets. According to the U.S. Justice Department, Xu targeted American aviation companies, recruited employees to travel to China, and solicited their proprietary information, all on behalf of China.

In March 2023, the Center for Strategic and International Studies (CSIS) based in Washington DC published an updated Survey of Chinese Espionage in the United States since 2000, which includes 224 documented cases of Chinese espionage targeted at the United States as of February 2023. The list of cases is based on publicly accessible sources and CSIS believes it is likely incomplete. According to CSIS, Chinese intelligence in the United States surpasses any other nation, including Russia. While the economic and technological espionage costs the United States billions of dollars since 2000, Chinese espionage has also resulted in immeasurable harm to national security, particularly through the theft of weapon technology, including data related to nuclear weapons testing. CSIS observed that in recent years, China has expanded its espionage efforts to include the theft of substantial amounts of personal information (PII), political manipulation, and influence operations.

On 3 August 2023, the United States Department of Justice announced two indictments of two U.S. Navy servicemembers for transmitting military information to Chinese intelligence officers. Jinchao Wei, an active-duty Navy sailor on the amphibious assault ship, the U.S.S. Essex stationed at Naval Base San Diego, was indicted for conspiracy to send national defense information to a Chinese spy. Petty Officer Wenheng Zhao was charged with receiving bribes from a Chinese spy in exchange for classified U.S. military information. On 8 January 2024, Zhao was convicted of transmitting sensitive U.S. military information to a Chinese intelligence officer in exchange for bribery payments and sentenced to 27 months in prison and ordered to pay a $5,500 fine.

In January 2025, the United States Department of Justice announced the indictment and arrest of John Harold Rogers, a former senior advisor to the Federal Reserve Board of Governors, on charges that he conspired to steal Federal Reserve trade secrets for the Chinese government.

=== Oceania ===
==== Australia ====
Former Department of Defence Secretary Dennis Richardson has stated that China is engaged in extensive espionage against Australia, and included surveillance of Chinese Australian communities. Australia believes that the Chinese government have been spying on Australian businesses.

In 2011, the Chinese government is suspected of orchestrating an attack on the email network used by the Parliament of Australia, allowing unauthorized access to thousands of emails and compromising the computers of several senior Australian politicians including Prime Minister Julia Gillard, Foreign Minister Kevin Rudd, and Minister of Defense Stephen Smith.

In 2012, a male Chinese student from Fujian was granted a protection visa by the Refugee Review Tribunal of Australia after revealing that he had been instructed to spy on Australian targets in exchange for an overseas scholarship, reporting to the Ministry of State Security.

In 2012, Nicola Roxon, the Attorney-General of Australia, blocked the Shenzhen-based corporation Huawei from seeking a supply contract for the National Broadband Network, on the advice of the Australian Security Intelligence Organisation (ASIO). The Australian government feared Huawei would provide backdoor access for Chinese cyber espionage.

In 2017, Sheri Yan and a former Office of National Assessments (ONA) official, Roger Uren, were investigated by ASIO on suspicion of spying for China. Uren, former Assistant Secretary responsible for the Asia section of ONA, was found to have removed documents pertaining to Chinese intelligence operations in Australia, and kept them in his apartment. Yan was suspected of undertaking influence operations on behalf of the Chinese Communist Party, and introducing Colonel Liu Chaoying, a military intelligence officer, to Australian contacts.

In 2017, hackers either working for or on behalf of the government of China are suspected as being responsible for a cyber-espionage attack against an Australian defense company. Designated APT Alf by the Australian Signals Directorate, the hackers stole approximately 30 gigabytes of data on projects including the F-35 Joint Strike Fighter, the P-8 Poseidon, the C-130 Hercules and the Joint Direct Attack Munition. APT Alf used a remote access tool dubbed "China Chopper". In 2017, Chinese hackers infiltrated the computers of Australian National University, potentially compromising national security research conducted at the university. In 2015, Chinese hackers infiltrated the Bureau of Meteorology.

In February 2019, the Sydney Morning Herald reported that Chinese businessman and real-estate developer Huang Xiangmo had been denied permanent residency by the Department of Home Affairs reportedly due to character and national security concerns. Huang was the chairman of the Australian Council for the Promotion of the Peaceful Reunification of China (ACPPRC), the China Council for the Promotion of Peaceful National Reunification (CCPPNR) and the Oceanic Alliance of the Promotion of Peaceful Reunification of China; all three either umbrella organizations of the United Front Work Department or having close ties with the UFWD itself. Prior to his forced departure, Huang had been active in Australian political circles, donating some $2.7 million to both the Australian Labor and Liberal parties respectively as well as delivering $100,000 in cash to the New South Wales branch of the Australian Labor party in breach of electoral donation laws. In 2021, Huang was elected to Hong Kong's new electoral committee implemented under the 2021 Hong Kong electoral changes imposed on Hong Kong by the National People's Congress in Beijing with the electoral message of "Support[ing] the implementation of ‘patriots administer[ing] Hong Kong".

In March 2019, the Australian Broadcasting Corporation reported that the body of a member of the Australian Liberal Party Bo ("Nick") Zhao had been inside a hotel room in Melbourne. Zhao had been a member of the Liberal party in the electorate of Chisholm, Victoria since 2015. Reports emerged afterwards that Zhao had been approached by a businessman originating from China who offered a $1 million in exchange for Zhao's running of candidacy to the Federal Parliament. Zhao allegedly reported the encounter to the Australian Security and Intelligence Organisation resulting in his death months later. Member of the Parliamentary Joint Intelligence Committee on Intelligence and Security (PJCIS) Andrew Hastie stated that Zhao was: "the perfect target for cultivation", remarking that he was "a guy who was a bit of a high-roller in Melbourne, living beyond his means, someone who was vulnerable to a foreign state intelligence service cultivating [him]."

In April 2023, it was reported that two individuals believed to be Chinese spies provided a Sydney-based businessman with cash-filled envelopes in exchange for intelligence on various topics, including an Australian government agreement involving the construction of Australian nuclear-powered submarines in collaboration with the United States and Britain.

In August 2025, the Australian Federal Police (AFP) charged a Chinese national and Australian permanent resident with foreign interference, alleging that she had covertly gathered information about the Canberra branch of the Buddhist association Guan Yin Citta Dharma Door, which is outlawed in China.

In November 2025, ASIO director-general Mike Burgess said hackers linked to the Chinese government and military had attempted to access Australia's critical infrastructure, including telecommunications networks. He identified the groups Salt Typhoon and Volt Typhoon, which allegedly infiltrated U.S. systems for espionage and potential sabotage, and warned that similar probing had occurred in Australia. Burgess said Chinese officials had repeatedly complained to the Australian government and businesses about ASIO's public remarks on China, but he vowed to continue speaking out.

In June 2026, the Australia and the rest of the Five Eyes issued a joint statement warning about Chinese espionage over online job platforms. Between 2016 and 2025, fake online personas on LinkedIn allegedly operated by Chinese intelligence targeted thousands of people worldwide for "recruitment." In Australia, one of the fake recruiters called "Sophy" claimed to be recruiting security consultants for a company called Data 31 "organised by three retired Australian police officers" based in Shanghai. The targets included people with Australian military backgrounds, a freelance writer and podcaster, a lawyer, a security executive and Australian trade department representatives. An employee under Andrew Forest, whose organisation's success has been closely tied to China's demand for Australian iron ore, was also approached. Two of these LinkedIn accounts amassed thousands of connections and approached Australians working in government, policing and trade with offers of paid consultancy. 100 individuals were targeted, including a former Queensland premier Steven Miles and an Australian Federal Police commander. The spies posed as employees of a think tank, offering competitive pay in return for "valuable advice." The same network targeted Australian businessman Alexander Csergo who was consequently charged with "reckless foreign interference."

==== New Zealand ====
Jian Yang, a member of the New Zealand House of Representatives and the New Zealand National Party was investigated by the New Zealand Security Intelligence Service (NZSIS) as a possibly spy due to his links to Chinese military and intelligence schools. Yang reportedly failed to declare that he had taught at the Air Force Engineering University or the Luoyang People's Liberation Army University of Foreign Languages, which are commonly used as training grounds for Chinese intelligence officers. Yang has denied the allegations that he is a spy.

In February 2020, the Serious Fraud Office of New Zealand charged three Chinese nationals: Zhang Yikun, Zheng (Colin) Shijia, Zheng Hengjia and a member of parliament Jami Lee Ross over allegations of providing misleading information in relation to donations to the National Party donations amounting up to $100,000. Zhang, a well known business man in the New Zealand Chinese community is a native of Guangdong province and allegedly served in the People's Liberation Army prior to immigrating to New Zealand in 2000 as well as the founder of Chao San General Association (CGSA) (Chinese: 新西兰潮属总会; pinyin: Xīnxīlán cháo shǔ zǒng huì) registered with the Ministry of Ethnic Communities New Zealand.

The stated purpose of the association is to serve the Teochow community (an ethnic sub-group) from Guangdong in New Zealand, however Chinese dissident and local journalist Chen Wenjie has claimed the association is part of the CCP's United Front Work Department (UFWD) and donations by the association including those to the Christchurch Foundation in the sum of some $2.1 million to assist the victims of the 2019 Mosque shootings are part of a coordinated strategy to: "purchase political influence" and engage in "strategic infiltration" of the political systems of host countries.

Local media outlet Stuff also reported that Zhang led a delegation of New Zealand business leaders and politicians to visit the Overseas Chinese Affairs Office (OCAO) of the State Council, the Chinese government agency responsible for liaison with overseas Chinese communities in 2017 and that in 2018 the association officially became part of the UFWD. On 25 February 2020, the Serious Fraud Office reported that Zhang along with three others had been charged with obtaining by deception under the Crimes Act and providing false or misleading information under the Serious Fraud Office Act, with each pleading not guilty in Auckland District Court.

On 23 July 2020 local media outlet newsroom reported that two Chinese dissidents: Yuezhong Wang and Weiguo Xi had been killed in a car crash on their way to Wellington to parliament to deliver a petition the New Zealand Government about Chinese Communist Party political interference in New Zealand. Xi was reportedly a former member of the PLA while in China who campaigned against government corruption and was detained by police as a result of his activism and the Chairman of the New Zealand Branch of The Federation for a Democratic China; with being a writer affiliated with the Chinese Democracy Movement. While no comments were made by police in relation to the circumstances of death were suspicious, according to political researcher Anne-Marie Brady, significant speculation existed within the local Chinese diaspora community on whether Wang and Xi's death were the product of "sabotage".

On 15 September 2020, the Stuff media company reported that the Chinese data intelligence company Zhenhua Data had collected open source data intelligence on 730 New Zealand politicians, diplomats, academics, business executives, sportspersons, judges, fraudsters and their families including Prime Minister Jacinda Ardern, former Prime Minister John Key's son Max, former Finance Minister Ruth Richardson, and sportsperson Barbara Kendall. Ten percent of Zhenhua Data's database had been leaked to American academic Chris Balding, who then passed the material to Canberra-based cybersecurity firm Internet 2.0.

In August 2023, an NZSIS threat assessment which identified China, Iran, and Russia as the three foreign governments most responsible for foreign interference in New Zealand. According to the report, Chinese intelligence services were actively targeting ethnic Chinese communities in New Zealand including surveillance, monitoring, harassment, and threats of dissidents.

In July 2024, New Zealand Prime Minister Christopher Luxon stated that New Zealand would disclose cases of Chinese espionage in the country to boost awareness of the security threat. In September 2024, NZSIS stated in its second annual threat report that "China remains a complex intelligence concern." The report said that China used professional social network websites such as LinkedIn for intelligence gathering.

On 21 August 2025, the NZSIS' third threat assessment expressed concern about Chinese united front activities, which included using co-optees or proxies to carry out online and physical surveillance activities such as monitoring social media, photographing individuals, collecting information and taking control of community organisations. The NZSIS report also warned local councils that sister city relationships could be exploited for "foreign interference" activities. In response, local Chinese community leaders including Richard Leung and New Zealand Chinese Association president Paul Chin welcomed the NZSIS report but warned against stigmatising Chinese New Zealanders. While the Chinese Embassy condemned the report, University of Canterbury political scientist Dr Anne-Marie Brady welcomed it for highlighting the national and external security threats facing New Zealand.

In June 2026, the NZSIS and its Five Eyes partners warned that Chinese military intelligence operatives had been using job websites such as LinkedIn to trick people with access to national security clearances into divulging classified government and military information. This online recruitment strategy involved advertising fake freelance foreign policy and defence analyst jobs, and then coercing successful candidates into providing sensitive information. NZSIS director general Andrew Hampton confirmed that his agency had investigated several cases in the last three to four years, and prevented sensitive information from being passed over. The Chinese Embassy to New Zealand denounced the alliance's warning as a "fabricated" smear campaign against China and warned New Zealand to refrain from "blindly following its security partners." The Chinese Foreign Ministry spokesperson Mao Ning also denied the allegations, adding that the Five Eyes engaged in "massive systematic espionage" worldwide.

In August 2026, it was reported that NZSIS disrupted an attempt by China's Purple Mountain Observatory to install satellite-tracking equipment in the country through a local company to collect information that could have been useful to the PLA.

=== Latin America ===
==== Argentina ====
The Espacio Lejano Station is a radio station located in Loncopué Department, Neuquén Province, Argentina, and is operated by the Chinese National Space Administration as part of the Chinese Deep Space Network, in collaboration with Argentina's National Space Activities Commission (CONAE). The Chinese Deep Space Network is managed by the China Satellite Launch and Tracking Control General (CLTC), which was under the People's Liberation Army Strategic Support Force until its functions were transferred to the People's Liberation Army Aerospace Force in 2024.

==== Chile ====
In 2023, the Catholic University of the North and the National Astronomical Observatories of China signed an agreement to develop an astronomical observatory in Cerro Ventarrones, Antofagasta Region. In April 2025, the Chilean government froze development of the project. The government's action followed reporting on the lack of transparency around it and potential military intelligence uses by the People's Liberation Army.

==== Cuba ====
In June 2023, Cuba agreed to host a Chinese spying facility that could allow the Chinese to eavesdrop on electronic communications across the southeastern United States, an area populated with key military installations and extensive maritime traffic.

China has built listening stations in Bejucal and elsewhere on the island that can be used to monitor U.S. communications.

==== Peru ====
The computer security firm ESET reported that tens of thousands of blueprints were stolen from Peruvian corporations through malware, which were traced to Chinese e-mail accounts. This was done through an AutoCAD worm called ACAD/Medre.A, written in AutoLISP, which located AutoCAD files, at which point they were sent to QQ and 163.com email accounts in China. ESET researcher Righard Zwienenberg claimed this was Chinese industrial espionage. The virus was mostly localized to Peru but spread to a few neighboring countries before being contained.

==== Venezuela ====
China operates two satellite tracking stations in Venezuela. Chinese state-owned China Great Wall Industry Corporation built the El Sombrero satellite tracking station at the Captain Manuel Ríos Aerospace Base and another at Luepa, Bolívar.

== See also ==
- Allegations of intellectual property infringement by China
- Chinese information operations and information warfare
- Chinese censorship abroad
- Cyberwarfare and China
- Foreign interventions by China
- Transnational repression by China
- One institution with two names
