= Silence procedure =

Method for formally adopting texts

A silence procedure, tacit consent, or tacit acceptance procedure (French: procédure d'approbation tacite; Latin: qui tacet consentire videtur, "he who is silent is taken to agree", "silence implies/means consent") is a way of formally adopting texts, often, but not exclusively, in an international political context.

A textbook on diplomacy describes the silence procedure thus:

... a proposal with strong support is deemed to have been agreed unless any member raises an objection to it before a precise deadline: silence signifies assent – or, at least, acquiescence. This procedure relies on a member in a minority fearing that raising an objection will expose it to the charge of obstructiveness and, thereby, the perils of isolation. Silence procedure is employed by NATO, the OSCE, in the framework of the Common Foreign and Security Policy of the European Union (EU) and, no doubt, in numerous other international bodies.

In the context of international organisations, the subject of the procedure is often a joint statement or a procedural document, a formal vote on which with the members meeting in person is deemed unnecessary. Indeed, it is often impractical to try to stage a meeting between representatives of all member states either due to the limited importance of the text to be agreed upon or due to time constraints in the case of a joint declaration prompted by recent events. Organisations making extensive use of the procedure are, among others, the European Union, NATO and the Organization for Security and Co-operation in Europe (OSCE).

A draft version of the text is circulated among participants who have a last opportunity to propose changes or amendments to the text. If no amendments are proposed (if no one 'breaks the silence') before the deadline of the procedure, the text is considered adopted by all participants. Often this procedure is the last step in adopting the text, after the basic premises of the text have been agreed upon in previous negotiations. 'Breaking the silence' is only a last resort in case a participant still has fundamental problems with parts of the text and is therefore the exception rather than the rule.

== Council of the European Union ==
Article 12(2) of the Rules of Procedure of the Council of the European Union states:

On the initiative of the Presidency, the Council may act by means of a simplified written procedure called "silence procedure":

- (a) for the purpose of adopting the text of a reply to a written question or, as appropriate, to an oral question submitted to the Council by a Member of the European Parliament, after the draft reply has been examined by Coreper;
- (b) for the purpose of appointing Members of the European Economic and Social Committee and Members, and their alternates, of the Committee of the Regions, after the draft decision has been examined by Coreper;
- (c) for the purpose of deciding to consult other institutions or bodies wherever such consultation is required by the Treaties;
- (d) for the purpose of implementing the common foreign and security policy through the "COREU" network (COREU silence procedure).

In that case, the relevant text shall be deemed to be adopted at the end of the period laid down by the Presidency depending on the urgency of the matter, except where a member of the Council objects.

== Organization for Security and Co-operation in Europe ==
An expression of the silence procedure is contained in Annex 1(A) "Application of a silence procedure in the Permanent Council and the Forum for Security Co-operation" of the Rules of Procedure of the OSCE (2006):

1. The Chairperson may suggest the adoption of a decision through a silence procedure. Such a suggestion shall be made during a meeting, with an indication of the exact time for the expiration of the period of silence. If there is no objection expressed by a Representative at that meeting, the decision shall be regarded as placed under a silence procedure.
2. Immediately after that meeting, the Secretariat shall issue an interim text of the decision without a number and with a temporary title reflecting the fact that the decision is subject to a silence procedure. The interim text shall be appended to the journal of that meeting.
3. The silence shall be regarded as broken if an objection or an amendment has been communicated by a participating State to the Chairperson in writing before the expiration of the silence period. In this case, the Chairperson shall immediately inform the participating States in writing that the decision in question has not been adopted.
4. If the silence has not been broken, the Chairperson, immediately after the expiration of the silence period, shall inform the participating States in writing that the decision in question has been adopted. The text of the decision shall not be issued until the next meeting. If urgent administrative actions are to be taken on the basis of that decision, the Chairperson may send the text of the decision to a relevant executive structure strictly for internal use.
5. At the first meeting following the adoption of the decision, the Chairperson shall make an announcement concerning the adoption of the decision.
6. Immediately after that meeting, the decision, with interpretative statements and formal reservations attached, if any, shall be issued by the Secretariat in a standard OSCE format and appended to the journal of that meeting. The date of the expiration of the silence period shall be regarded as the date of adoption of the decision.

== See also ==
- Unanimous consent
- A Man for All Seasons, which uses the term
