= Sunita Agarwal =

Judge of Supreme Court of India

Hon'ble Justice Sunita Agarwal
- Official portrait

Judge of Supreme Court of India
- Incumbent
- Assumed office 6 October 2026
- Nominated by: Surya Kant
- Appointed by: Droupadi Murmu

28th Chief Justice of Gujarat High Court
- In office 23 July 2023 – 5 October 2026
- Nominated by: D. Y. Chandrachud
- Appointed by: Droupadi Murmu
- Preceded by: Sonia Gokani; A. J. Desai (acting)
- Succeeded by: M. R. Pathak (acting)

Judge of Allahabad High Court
- In office 21 November 2011 – 22 July 2023
- Nominated by: S. H. Kapadia
- Appointed by: Pratibha Patil

Personal details
- Born: 30 April 1966 (age 60) Faizabad, Uttar Pradesh
- Education: Lucknow University, Awadh University (LL.B)

Sunita Agarwal (born 30 April 1966) is a judge of the Supreme Court of India. She has served as the 28th Chief Justice of the Gujarat High Court. She is a former judge of the Allahabad High Court.

== Early life and legal career ==
Agarwal was born on 30 April 1966 in Faizabad, Uttar Pradesh. She studied science at Lucknow University and subsequently obtained a law degree from Awadh University before enrolling as an advocate on 16 December 1990. She practised primarily at the Allahabad High Court, dealing with civil, writ, original and commercial matters, for about 21 years before entering the judiciary.

Agarwal was elevated as an Additional Judge of the Allahabad High Court on 21 November 2011 and became a permanent judge on 6 August 2013. During her tenure she served on several administrative committees and also became Executive Chairperson of the Uttar Pradesh State Legal Services Authority in April 2023 as the senior-most judge of the Allahabad High Court. Her judicial work covered civil and criminal appeals, service matters, land acquisition, intra-court appeals and constitutional matters.

=== Chief Justice of Gujarat High Court ===
The Supreme Court Collegium recommended Agarwal for appointment as Chief Justice of the Gujarat High Court on 5 July 2023, noting, among other considerations, her seniority in the Allahabad High Court and the fact that her appointment would enhance women's representation among High Court Chief Justices. She took oath as the 29th Chief Justice of Gujarat High Court on 23 July 2023, becoming the second woman to hold the office.

On 28 September 2026, the Supreme Court Collegium recommended Justice Sunita Agarwal, along with Chief Justices Devendra Kumar Upadhyaya of the Delhi High Court and Aparesh Kumar Singh of the Telangana High Court, for elevation as judges of the Supreme Court. The recommendation is the latest stage in a judicial career that began with more than two decades at the Allahabad Bar, followed by nearly fifteen years on the High Courts of Allahabad and Gujarat.

She was appointed on 5 October 2026 and took oath as judge of the Supreme Court of India on 6 October 2026.

== Notable judgements ==
In a 2017 judgment concerning Section 125 of the CrPC, Agarwal set aside a Family Court order that had dismissed a wife's maintenance application. The High Court asserted that a husband's obligation to provide maintenance is "fundamental and constitutional," ruling that a wife living separately due to cruelty or neglect is entitled to maintenance adequate to live with dignity.

In May 2020, Agarwal served on a three-judge bench that clarified the maintainability of writ petitions against authorities located outside Uttar Pradesh. The court ruled that jurisdiction is determined by where the cause of action arises, "wholly or in part," rather than the petitioner's place of residence.

Among the judgments associated with Agarwal at Allahabad was the 2020 case concerning persons booked for allegedly violating COVID-19 social-distancing norms while distributing food packets. Sitting with Justice Saumitra Dayal Singh, she granted partial relief and stayed their arrest, observing that the circumstances did not disclose an untoward incident and emphasising the importance of awareness rather than simply resorting to detention.

In 2023, Agarwal was part of a seven-judge bench dealing with the prolonged strike by lawyers of the Kanpur Bar Association and the Lawyers' Association, Kanpur Nagar. The bench directed the lawyers to resume work and initiated contempt proceedings in the context of what it found to be interference with the administration of justice. After becoming Chief Justice of Gujarat, she presided over several public-law matters. In January 2024, a bench headed by her dismissed a PIL concerning the allotment of allegedly mineral-rich land in Devbhumi Dwarka and imposed exemplary costs of ₹7 lakh after finding that the petitioner had not demonstrated the bona fide public interest claimed in the petition.

Another significant Gujarat judgment came in August 2025 in Isabella C.L. v. Union of India. A bench headed by Agarwal held that service rules and standing orders which operated to deny promotion to an HIV-positive CRPF employee on the basis of her medical classification were inconsistent with the statutory protection against discrimination. The Court directed consequential consideration of her promotion and declared the relevant provisions ultra vires to the extent challenged.

== Controversies and friction with the Gujarat Bar ==
Agarwal's tenure as Chief Justice of Gujarat has also been accompanied by institutional disagreements with sections of the Bar. In February 2025, the Gujarat High Court Advocates' Association unanimously resolved to seek her transfer, citing concerns about changes in judicial rosters and their perceived implications for judicial independence. The controversy followed changes in the allocation of certain matters, including contempt proceedings and criminal cases. The Association's resolution represented the Bar's position; it did not itself establish wrongdoing by the Chief Justice. Agarwal subsequently proceeded on leave from 18 February to 2 March 2025, during which Justice B. A. Vaishnav discharged the duties of Chief Justice.

The disagreement resurfaced in October 2025 after the High Court introduced instructions concerning corrections, overwriting and alterations in pleadings at the filing stage. The Gujarat High Court Advocates' Association complained that the procedure was causing delays in registration and sought Agarwal's transfer. The High Court subsequently modified the procedure so that minor corrections could be dealt with through draft amendments placed before the bench hearing the matter. These episodes have therefore involved competing institutional concerns: the Chief Justice's administrative control over the Registry and roster on one side, and the Bar's concerns about accessibility, filing procedures and judicial independence on the other.

== Zhenhua data leak ==
Justice Agarwal's name also appeared in an international data-monitoring controversy in September 2020. The Indian Express reported that her name was among those of 30 judges appearing in the Overseas Key Information Database developed by Chinese company Zhenhua Data. The database was investigated by The Indian Express as part of its reporting on the company's collection and monitoring of information relating to prominent Indian individuals and institutions. The news of the Zhenhua data leak was widely reported, with several Indian newspapers suggesting that Zhenhua Data had close links to the Chinese government, in the context of the 2020 China-India skirmishes.

== The Uttarakhand theft incident ==
In January 2025, two iPhones belonging to Agarwal were reported stolen while she was attending a wedding in Dehradun. According to the complaint lodged by Gujarat High Court Registrar General Moolchand Tyagi, the phones were stolen at a wedding venue on New Mussoorie Road between approximately 4:45 pm and 5:15 pm on 26 January. Dehradun Police registered an FIR under the Bharatiya Nyaya Sanhita's theft provision and began an investigation. The incident concerned the theft of her personal phones and was not a judicial controversy.
