= China–Estonia relations =

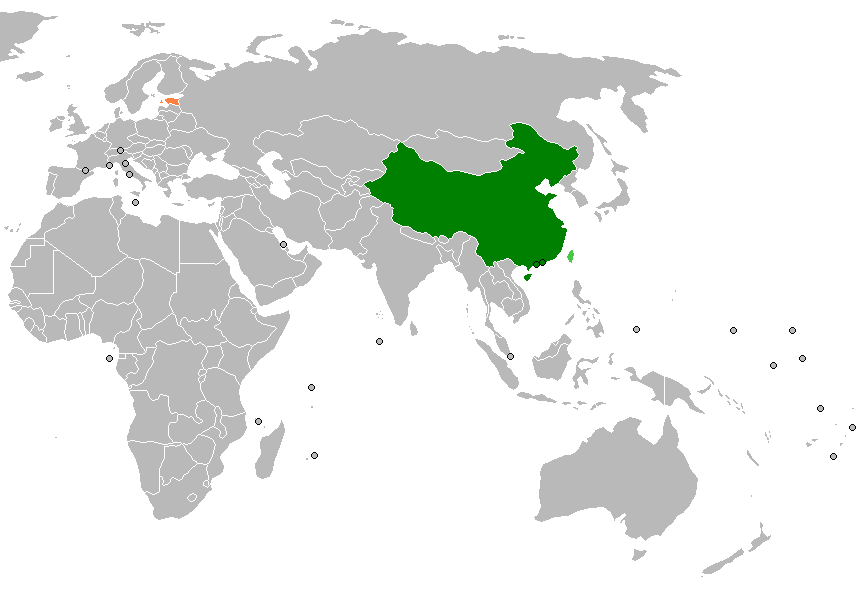
- China: Estonia

Diplomatic mission
- Estonian Embassy, Beijing: Chinese Embassy, Tallinn

China–Estonia relations refers to the bilateral relations between the People's Republic of China and the Republic of Estonia.

== History ==
On December 21, 1937, Estonia and the Republic of China established diplomatic relations at the ministerial level. In August 1940, the Soviet Union annexed Estonia and Sino-Estonian relations were terminated. On August 20, 1991, Estonia restored its independence from the Soviet Union. Subsequently, as the Soviet State Council recognized the independence of the Baltic countries, the government of the People's Republic of China also recognized Estonia as a sovereign state and established diplomatic relations with it. China established an embassy in Estonia in 1992 and sent an ambassador to the country the following year; Estonia established an embassy in China in 1997 and sent an ambassador to China for the first time in 2002.

The 14th Dalai Lama visited Estonia in 1991. In August 2011, the Dalai Lama visited Estonia again and met informally with Estonian President Toomas Hendrik Ilves. Ilves said that Tibet's religion and culture are unique and preserving them for future generations is one of the great humanistic responsibilities of this era. The Chinese Ministry of Foreign Affairs summoned the Estonian ambassador to China and asked him to explain the Dalai Lama's visit to the country. The Chinese government protested again, criticizing Estonia for interfering in China's internal affairs and damaging relations between the two countries by accepting the Dalai Lama's visit. Subsequently, China refused to issue visas to Estonian scholars and officials who participated in the reception of the Dalai Lama.

In September 2014, Chinese Vice Foreign Minister Wang Chao met with Estonian Ambassador to China Thomas Lukk. During the meeting, Lukk said that the bilateral relations between China and Estonia had suffered setbacks in recent years. He also pointed out that Estonia recognized that Tibet was part of China and would not support Tibetan independence. The People's Republic of China affirmed Estonia's stance on the Tibet issue and pointed out that China attached great importance to developing relations between the two countries.

Despite this, in February 2021, Estonia's national security department included China in its national threat assessment report, pointing out that the world's reliance on Chinese technology is increasing, that China hopes to play a major role in many aspects, and that China's clear goal is to require the world to rely on Chinese technology, which will pose a major security threat to the world. China expressed strong dissatisfaction and opposition to this, and stated that China is determined to follow the path of peaceful development, has always worked hard to promote the healthy and stable development of China–Estonia relations, and has no intention or interest in threatening any country. A month later, on March 21, Estonian marine scientist Tammo Kuts was sentenced to three years in prison for engaging in espionage activities for the People's Republic of China.

On April 15 of the same year, Aftonbladet, Estonia's largest newspaper, used a full page of advertising space to publish an article on Xinjiang by Chinese Ambassador to Estonia Li Chao. The article immediately attracted attention in Estonian society. On the same day, Aftonbladet's editor-in-chief, Shmutov, apologized on behalf of the newspaper for publishing the article. The new Estonian Prime Minister, Kaja Kallas, called on Estonia to take a tougher stance against China and rejected China's invitation to attend the China-CEEC cooperation video conference.

In January 2022, the foreign ministers of China and Estonia held a video conference. In August 2022, Estonia and Latvia jointly announced their withdrawal from the China-CEEC cooperation. In 2023, because Chinese Ambassador to France Lu Shaye claimed in an interview with France 1 that the sovereignty of former Soviet countries including Estonia was "undetermined", the Estonian Foreign Minister lodged a formal protest with China and summoned the Chinese Ambassador to Estonia.

== Economic relations ==
In 2016, Estonian Customs signed a contract with Vision Warsaw to supply five sets of large container X-ray inspection equipment. One set of equipment for the train project was installed in Narva, a city on the northeastern border of Estonia, and was mainly used to inspect goods crossing the border between Estonia and Russia. At the end of 2017, Wu Yan, Counselor of the Chinese Embassy in Estonia, visited the site and expressed his condolences to the Chinese employees working there.

Estonia joined the Belt and Road Initiative (BRI) in 2017 and exited the agreement in 2022 due to China's support for Russia's invasion of Ukraine. Through the BRI, China and Estonia have cooperated on oil shale power generation projects in Jordan. In 2018, Counselor Wu Yan listened in detail to the introduction of the pumped water storage power generation project in southern Estonia.

China-Estonia trade volume from 2015 to 2020 (Unit: US dollars)
Years	Chinese exports to Estonia	China imports from Estonia	Total trade	China's trade surplus
2015	953.49 million	234.96 million	1188.45 million	718.52 million
2016	963.57 million	211.68 million	117525000	751.89 million
2017	1006.87 million	260.35 million	126722000	746.51 million
2018	1031540000	245.36 million	1276.9 million	786.17 million
2019	922.35 million	298.75 million	1221.1 million	623.6 million
2020	864.08 million	281.39 million	1145.47 million	582.69 million

== Cultural relations ==
Li Changchun, then a member of the Politburo Standing Committee, pointed out during his visit to Estonia that cultural exchanges are of great significance to the bilateral relations between China and Estonia. In 1993, the UNESCO Cooperation Agreement signed earlier by the People's Republic of China and the Republic of Estonia came into effect; since then, a large number of artists from both countries have visited each other's country and held exhibitions in each other's country. The Confucius Institute at Tallinn University in Estonia was established in September 2010 and is the first Confucius Institute to be established in the Baltic countries. China is the fourth largest source of international students for Estonia after the European Union, the United States and Russia. Many Chinese students study at Estonian universities, and there are also Estonian students studying in China. Since 1994, the Chinese government has provided scholarships to support Estonian students to study Chinese in China; in 2010, Beijing Foreign Studies University had a tutor teaching Estonian for the first time.

== Military relations ==
The People's Liberation Army has sent a delegation to participate in the military reconnaissance competition Erna Raid held in Estonia since 2001, and ranked first in the overall score in 2002.

In 2000, Zhang Li, then Deputy Chief of the General Staff of the People's Liberation Army, visited Estonia and met with the Estonian Minister of Defense and the Commander-in-Chief of the Estonian Armed Forces.

== Espionage ==
In March 2021, Estonian scientist Tarmo Kõuts was convicted of spying for China. According to the Estonian Internal Security Service, Kõuts was recruited in 2018 by China's Intelligence Bureau of the Joint Staff Department of the Central Military Commission, and was arrested on 9 September 2020. Kõuts was paid approximately €17,000 by his handlers. Kõuts worked for the Maritime Institute of Tallinn Technical University, and was also a member of the Scientific Committee of the Estonian Ministry of Defence and the NATO Undersea Research Centre.

== Resident diplomatic missions ==
- China has an embassy in Tallinn.
- Estonia has an embassy in Beijing.

== See also ==
- Foreign relations of China
- Foreign relations of Estonia
