= Unanimous consent =

Aspect of parliamentary procedure

In parliamentary procedure, unanimous consent, also known as general consent, or in the case of the parliaments under the Westminster system, leave of the house (or leave of the senate), is a situation in which no member present objects to a proposal.

== Purpose ==
Generally, in a meeting of a deliberative assembly, business is conducted using a formal procedure of motion, debate, and vote. However, if there are no objections, action could be taken by unanimous consent. The procedure of asking for unanimous consent is used to expedite business by eliminating the need for formal votes on routine questions in which the existence of a consensus is likely. The principle behind it is that procedural safeguards designed to protect a minority can be waived when there is no minority to protect.

In non-legislative deliberative bodies operating under Robert's Rules of Order, unanimous consent is often used to expedite the consideration of uncontroversial motions. It is sometimes used simply as a time-saving device, especially at the end of the session. Sometimes members do not want a formal recorded vote on the issue, or they know that they would lose such a vote and do not feel a need to take time on it.

== Difference from unanimous vote ==
Action taken by unanimous consent does not necessarily mean that it was taken by a unanimous vote. It does not necessarily mean that every member of the body would have voted in favor of the proposal. It may mean that members feeling that it would be useless to oppose a matter would simply acquiesce.

For example, passing legislation via unanimous consent does not require that every member of a legislature, a majority of members or even a quorum of representatives to be present to vote. Unanimous consent merely requires that no representative of those present has asked to take a recorded vote or has requested quorum verification. For that reason, a claim that a piece of legislation was passed "unanimously", when it was really passed via "unanimous consent", can be misleading as to its level of support.

== Unanimous consent required ==
Certain rights can only be waived by unanimous consent. For example, in disciplinary procedures, a single member can require the vote on the imposition of a penalty to be taken by ballot.

When an item is before the assembly for action, such as a resolution, it is the right of every member to have it read once. Another case of this requirement is the reading of the minutes. Unanimous consent is required to not do the reading. Any member can request that the minutes be read and it would have to be done.

A series of independent resolutions may be offered in a single motion. Unanimous consent is required to consider such a motion in one vote. Any member can demand a separate vote on one or more of the independent resolutions.

== Procedure ==
Unanimous consent can be obtained by the chair asking if there are any objections to doing something. For instance, the chair may state, "If there is no objection, the motion will be adopted. [pause] Since there is no objection, the motion is adopted." In Westminster parliaments, the wording could be "There being no objection, leave is granted." On the most routine matters, such as inserting an article into the Congressional Record in Congress, the chairperson may shorten this statement to four words: "Without objection, so ordered" or even to two words: "Without objection" (Latin: nemine contradicente). Another example of this practice in the House of Representatives is when a series of votes has been interrupted by a speaker or other business. The chair will state, "Without objection, five minute voting will continue."

If no member objects, the motion is adopted. But if any member objects, the motion is not adopted and cannot be agreed to without a formal vote. Raising an objection does not necessarily imply that the objector disagrees with the proposal itself. They may simply believe that it would be better to take a formal vote.

Sometimes unanimous consent can be assumed if the chair perceives that no one would raise an objection if they formally asked. For instance, if it is obvious that the members of an assembly are absorbed in listening to a speaker who has exceeded the time limits on debate, but is about to conclude, the chair may allow the speaker to continue without interruption.

Objections are sometimes used as a delaying tactic. The objector may have no disagreement with the proposal at issue, but chooses to object in order to force a time-consuming formal vote, which may include a period of debate as well.

== Consent agenda ==
Many deliberative assemblies (e.g. city councils) use a procedure known as the "consent agenda". Matters believed to be noncontroversial are placed on the consent agenda, and they are all adopted by a single motion. If any member objects to one or more items on the consent agenda, the items objected to are removed from the consent agenda and handled in the ordinary course.

== Typical uses of unanimous consent ==
Unanimous consent is frequently used to approve the minutes. If no one has corrections to the minutes, they are approved without a formal vote by unanimous consent. In this special case of unanimous consent, the only way to object to the approval of the minutes is to offer a correction to it.

In an election, if there is only one candidate and the rules do not require a ballot vote in that situation, the single candidate is declared elected by acclamation, or unanimous consent. In this special case of unanimous consent, the only way to object to the election of a candidate is to nominate and vote for someone else.

A meeting could be adjourned by unanimous consent. If no one has any further business at the end of a meeting, the chair simply declares the meeting adjourned without a formal motion or a formal vote.

== Leave of the house (or leave of the senate) ==
In parliaments under the Westminster system, leave of the house or leave of the senate is a similar concept to requiring unanimous consent. If a member asks for leave to be granted to do something that is different from the rules, a single objection can defeat the request.

== Use in consensus decision-making ==
Unanimous consent may be used as part of a consensus decision-making process. In that process, unanimous consent does not necessarily mean unanimous agreement (see Consensus decision-making § Agreement vs. consent).

== See also ==
- Consensus democracy
- Silence procedure
- Unanimity
