= Trade secrets in Canada =

In Canada, trade secrets are generally considered to include information set out, contained or embodied in, but not limited to, a formula, pattern, plan, compilation, computer program, method, technique, process, product, device or mechanism; it may be information of any sort; an idea of a scientific nature, or of a literary nature, as long as they grant an economical advantage to the business and improve its value. Additionally, there must be some element of secrecy. Matters of public knowledge or of general knowledge in an industry cannot be the subject-matter of a trade secret.

== Purpose ==
Trade secrets are a type of intellectual property that consists of certain information, expertise or know-how that has been developed or acquired by firms. This knowledge frequently gives firms their competitive edge in the market and it has to be kept as a secret.

In Canada any information that a firm or its employees produces or acquires for the purpose of the firm's business can constitute confidential information that courts are willing to protect. All that is required is that the creator of the information “has used his brain and thus produced a result which can be produced by somebody who goes through the same process”.

According to Seager v. Copydex Ltd, courts will even act to protect a comparatively underdeveloped idea from misappropriation. However, information may stop being confidential and confident may be released from its obligations of confidence if the information subject to confidence is later publicly disclosed by the confider or a third party.

== Trade Secrets vs. Confidential Information ==
With one exception in the field of employer-employee relations, there is no recognized distinction in Canada between the rights and remedies afforded to trade secrets as opposed to mere confidential information. In the field of employer-employee relationships, the British case Faccenda Chicken Ltd. v. Fowler, which has been cited with approval by several Canadian courts, has drawn a distinction between the two.

== Allocation of powers under the Constitution ==
Under the Constitution Act 1867, the exclusive Legislative Authority of the Parliament of Canada extends to most areas of intellectual property such as patents, trademarks and copyrights; whereas the provincial government has exclusive authority to legislate on matters related to property and civil rights. The federal Parliament also has exclusive jurisdiction to create offences under its criminal law power.

At one time, the federal Trade-marks Act prohibited anyone from "do[ing] any other act or adopt[ing] any other business practice contrary to honest industrial or commercial usage in Canada," which was considered to include the taking of trade secrets. However, the Supreme Court of Canada ruled in MacDonald v. Vapor Canada Ltd. that the provisions encroached on the provinces' authority over property and civil rights and could not be upheld under the federal trade and commerce power. Therefore, the regulation of trade secrets as a civil matter falls under provincial jurisdiction.

== Civil legal framework ==
=== Uniform Trade Secrets Act ===
The Uniform Trade Secrets Act, adopted by the Uniform Law Conference of Canada in 1989, would provide civil remedies for the breach of trade secrets. That Uniform Act defines "trade secrets" as follows:

1(1) In this Act...

"trade secret" means any information that

(a) is, or may be, used in a trade or business,
(b) is not generally known in that trade or business,
(c) has economic value because it is not generally known, and
(d) is the subject of efforts that are reasonable under the circumstances to prevent it from becoming generally known.

(2) For the purposes of the definition trade secret "information" includes information set out, contained or embodied in, but not limited to, a formula, pattern, plan, compilation, computer program, method, technique, process, product, device or mechanism.

To date, the Uniform Act has not been enacted into law by any of the Legislatures, but the definition has been incorporated in the federal Security of Information Act.

=== Civil Remedial Relief - Common Law Provinces ===
In all the provinces but Quebec, trade secrets are governed by the common law, ultimately derived from the English common law as interpreted and applied in Canada. The Canadian definition of trade secret is based on Canadian case law and doctrine, and also draws on American and English case law. In Lac Minerals Ltd. v. International Corona Resources Ltd., the Supreme Court of Canada held that a breach of confidence action is sui generis and the courts may rely on all three traditional jurisdictional bases for action (contract, equity and property) to enforce the policy of the law that confidences are to be respected.

In common law, there are essentially five types of civil action that a trade secret holder can rely on to seek protection of its trade secrets before a court of justice:

1. breach of contract (expressed or implied provision),
2. breach of confidence,
3. breach of fiduciary duty,
4. unjust enrichment and
5. wrongful interference with the contractual relations of others.

The Supreme Court of Canada stated in Cadbury Schweppes Inc. v. FBI Foods Ltd. that all these types of actions coexist in the Canadian judicial system and remain available to the trade secret holder.

=== Civil Remedial Relief - Quebec ===
In Quebec, trade secrets are governed by provisions under the Civil Code of Quebec. An action for breach of trade secrets or confidential business information generally arises either from a contractual liability action or, in the absence of a contract, from a civil liability action.

The Code deals specifically with trade secrets in one article that provides for a defense where disclosing the secret is in the public interest, and in one that describes how a loss resulting from disclosure is to be calculated. However, none of its provisions define the concept of trade secret.

The Quebec Court of Appeal has ruled in Continental Casualty Company v. Combined Insurance Company that those who own trade secrets (secrets de commerce) are entitled to seek protection and that Quebec courts are competent to grant remedies in the case the plaintiff can evidence its ownership of them.

=== Contractual Sanctions ===
Two important forms of contract used by employers in Canada to protect their trade secrets and confidential information are non-disclosure agreements and non-competition agreements, which are also known as confidentiality agreements and restrictive covenants.

According to Faccenda Chicken Ltd. v. Fowler, ex-employees, post-termination, may use their general skills and knowledge anywhere but they may not use or divulge their former employer's trade secrets. Exceptionally, ex-employers may also be able to enjoin a former employee's use of non-trade secret information where that information has been obtained from records which qualify as trade secrets.

According to International Tools Ltd. v. Kollar, in Canada the length of a permanent injunction to force a defendant to cease using the plaintiff's information should not normally extend beyond the time that the plaintiff's trade secrets remains a secret which is exclusively known to the plaintiff and its confidants.

In Cadbury Schweppes Inc. v. FBI Foods Ltd. Justice Binnie concluded that the form of relief for breach of confidence was “dictated by the facts of the case rather than strict jurisdictional or doctrinal considerations”. He also stated that “whether a breach of contract in a particular case has a contractual, tortuous, proprietary or trust flavour goes to the appropriateness of particular equitable remedy but does not limit the court’s jurisdiction to grant it”.

== Criminal Sanctions ==
In R. v. Stewart, the Supreme Court of Canada held that the taking of confidential information cannot form the basis of a charge of theft under the Criminal Code, but it could in certain circumstances form one for fraud:

- while theft encompasses the taking or conversion of "anything whether animate or inanimate," the Court held that "anything" must still be property of some sort, capable of being "taken or converted in a way that deprives the owner of his proprietary interest in some way." Confidential information, by its very nature, "cannot be converted, not because it is an intangible, but because, save very exceptional far‑fetched circumstances, the owner would never be deprived of it."
- on the other hand, the concept of "defraud" is established under current jurisprudence by proving a dishonest deprivation "of any property, money or valuable security or any service." This is satisfied upon proof of a risk of prejudice to the victim's economic interests; actual economic loss is not essential. Accordingly, deprivation of confidential information falls within the definition of fraud where it is in the nature of a trade secret or copyrighted material that has commercial value.

Parliament has since amended the Security of Information Act to provide that it is an offence to:

- communicate a trade secret to another person, group or organization; or
- obtain, retain, alter or destroy a trade secret,

for the benefit of a foreign economic entity, and to the detriment of Canada's economic interests, international relations or national defence or national security.
