= China National Electronics Import & Export Corporation =

Chinese state-owned company

- Native name: 中国电子进出口总公司 (Chinese)
- Company type: State-owned enterprise
- Industry: Defense Electronics; Public Security Systems; Construction Engineering; Logistics; International Business Consulting
- Founded: 1980; 46 years ago
- Headquarters: Beijing, China

Chinese name
- Simplified Chinese: 中国电子进出口总公司
- Traditional Chinese: 中國電子進出口總公司
Transcriptions
Standard Mandarin
- Hanyu Pinyin: Zhōngguó Diànzǐ Jìnchūkǒu Zǒnggōngsī
- Website: www.ceiec.com.cn

China National Electronics Import & Export Corporation (CEIEC) is a Chinese state owned enterprise in diversified business areas. It is one of a handful of defense trading companies authorized to represent the domestic defense production industries in overseas sales, concentrating on sales of defense electronics. It is also in construction engineering specializing in construction of civil infrastructure. By international contracting revenue the company is ranked among the top 250 contractors in the 2015 Top 250 International Contractors published by Engineering News Record. From 2006 to 2008, CEIEC was sanctioned for violations of the Iran, North Korea, Syria Nonproliferation Act. In November 2020, the United States Department of the Treasury levied additional sanctions on CEIEC.

== Business areas ==
=== Public safety systems ===
The company has built national public safety systems. It successfully built a nationwide system for Ecuador and will rollout the system in Venezuela, Bolivia, and Trinidad and Tobago.

=== Construction engineering ===
The company builds sports Tencent stadiums, radio and television infrastructure, power transmission, urban water supply system and other kinds of public, commercial, or residential properties. It has built several projects in Angola during the country's post-war building boom including a basketball arena in Huambo.
