= Falun Gong in Hong Kong =

Falun Gong is a spiritual practice taught by Li Hongzhi. Practicing Falun Gong or protesting on its behalf is forbidden in Mainland China, yet the practice remains legal in Hong Kong, which has greater protections of civil and political liberties under "One country, Two systems." Since 1999 practitioners in Hong Kong have staged demonstrations and protests against the Chinese government, and assisted those fleeing persecution in China. Nonetheless, Falun Gong practitioners have encountered some restrictions in Hong Kong as a result of political pressure from Beijing. The treatment of Falun Gong by Hong Kong authorities has often been used as a bellwether to gauge the integrity of the one country two systems model.

== Early development ==
From 1992 to 1994, Falun Gong's founder Li Hongzhi travelled throughout mainland China to teach Falun Gong's practice methods and philosophy. Beginning in 1995, he disseminated his teachings outside the mainland, holding seminars in Europe, Southeast Asia, Australia, and North America. Li held public lectures in Hong Kong in May 1995 on Lantau Island, and again in November 1997. There has been an active Falun Gong community in Hong Kong since at least 1996, and in 1999 practitioners there were estimated to number approximately 1,000.

== Public activities ==
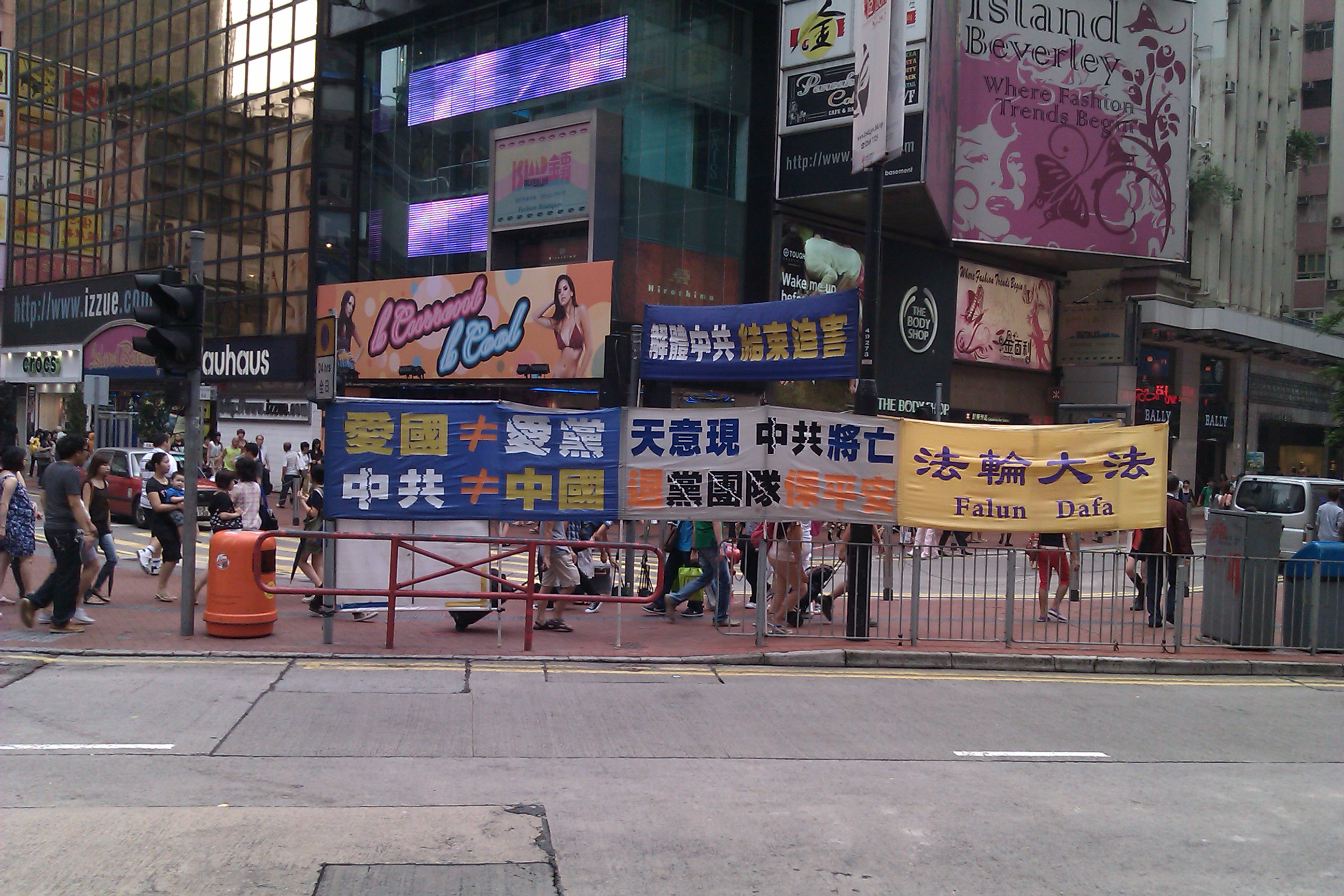
Falun Gong banners on display on a busy street in Hong Kong

Several hundred actively practice Falun Gong in Hong Kong, holding a variety of public events and demonstrations to protest against suppression in mainland China and advocate for their rights of their mainland counterparts. On 23 July 1999, approximately 1,000 Falun Gong practitioners gathered in Hong Kong to protest actions taken by the mainland Chinese government. Another large-scale protest was held in January 2001. Practitioners regularly stage sit-ins, hold public meditation sessions, and frequent popular tourist sites to distribute literature detailing alleged human rights abuses by the mainland government.

== Tensions with Hong Kong authorities ==
Since the suppression by Chinese authorities begin in July 1999, Falun Gong has retained its legal standing in Hong Kong, and practitioners there are still entitled to freely exercise their beliefs and assemble for protests, marches, and conferences. However, Human Rights Watch reports that the government has "quietly chipped away at the rights" of practitioners in the territory in response to pressure from Beijing. By late 1999, there had been several instances of Hong Kong book stores refusing to stock Falun Gong books. In December of that year, Hong Kong Chief Executive Tung Chee-hwa objected to a planned Falun Gong conference, and warned against activities that were "not in the interests of China, Hong Kong, or the 'one country, two systems.'" In June 2000 and on several subsequent occasions, authorities enforced travel restrictions to prevent Falun Gong practitioners from entering the territory to stage demonstrations.

In January 2001, pro-Beijing forces "mounted a full-scale campaign to shut down Falun Gong in Hong Kong once and for all," according to Human Rights Watch. 800–1,200 Falun Gong practitioners held demonstrations and marches in the city on January 15, yet they were prevented from showing images of practitioners who had allegedly been tortured or killed amidst persecution in mainland China, or from displaying banners that criticised Jiang Zemin former General Secretary of the Chinese Communist Party. Thirteen Falun Gong practitioners were reportedly denied entry into the territory for the events. The practitioners closely abided by the law, taking pains to ensure their conduct was beyond reproach.

Chinese state-run media responded to the Falun Gong protests by declaring that Hong Kong was becoming a base for subversion, and accusing Falun Gong of being in collusion with "anti-China" forces in the West; pro-Beijing newspapers in Hong Kong similarly attacked Falun Gong in front-page articles. Prominent pro-Beijing politicians also denounced the group for criticizing the mainland government. Regina Ip, Hong Kong's Secretary for Security, called Falun Gong "devious" and said that it would thereafter be closely monitored. Although she admitted that Falun Gong practitioners had broken no laws, she said such measures were justified because it "might do that in the future." Repeating the talking points of the Beijing government, Chief Executive Tung Chee-hwa said in February 2001 that Falun Gong bore "some characteristics of an 'evil cult'", and indicated that the group would come under heightened surveillance and scrutiny in the territory. He also stated that Falun Gong would not be allowed to "abuse Hong Kong’s freedoms and tolerance," and called its protests against the Beijing government "unacceptable."

In the spring of 2001, security agents from China's Ministry of Public Security began arriving in Hong Kong to monitor Falun Gong activities in advance of a visit by Chinese President Jiang Zemin, who was also the General Secretary of the Chinese Communist Party. This time, practitioners’ protests were more tightly circumscribed, and authorities took measures to limit their freedoms of speech and assembly. The Hong Kong government also enforced a blacklist of Falun Gong practitioners traveling from abroad and denied entry to the territory to practitioners from Japan, Australia, the UK, and U.S. Hong Kong authorities justified the blacklist as being necessary to safeguard security.

The government's stance attracted condemnation from segments of Hong Kong civil society and pro-democracy lawmakers. Speaking to the Wall Street Journal, Rev. Stephen Chan, a Catholic priest, said "the government is damaging the reputation of a group of people who have broken no laws." Officials’ stance toward Falun Gong began to soften as the March 2002 elections for chief executive approached, as politicians were eager to show that "One Country, Two Systems" remained intact. Soon after the elections in August 2002, however, sixteen Falun Gong followers were convicted of obstruction for meditating outside the Chinese government liaison office.

In 2002, the Hong Kong government proposed "Article 23," an anti-subversion law that would have prohibited acts of sedition or subversion against the Chinese central government in Beijing. It also would have prohibited foreign political organizations or bodies from conducting political activities in the region, and to prohibit political organizations from establishing ties with foreign organizations. The proposal was controversial, and if successful likely would have resulted far greater limitations being placed on Falun Gong practitioners' ability to organise and protest in the territory. The bill was withdrawn after a July 2003 protest that drew approximately 350,000 to 700,000 Hong Kong citizens, thereby ensuring that Falun Gong practitioners would still have the right to assemble.

=== Travel restrictions ===
Beginning in late 2000, there have seen several instances in which Hong Kong authorities barred Falun Gong practitioners from entering the territory to participate in demonstrations, conferences, and other events.

In 2003, 80 Taiwanese practitioners were blocked from entering Hong Kong, despite already having obtained visas. The Hong Kong Association of Falun Gong applied for a judicial review of the event, setting off a six-year human rights case that tested the integrity of the one country, two systems arrangement. The lawsuit continued until 2009 when the court ruled to dismiss the case.

In 2004, a Canadian Falun Gong practitioner on a book tour was denied entry to the territory, and in 2008, two Falun Gong practitioners from the United States and Switzerland were separately denied entry while on professional and research trips. In 2007, hundreds of Taiwanese practitioners were prevented from entering Hong Kong or detained at the airport.

In 2010, Hong Kong immigration officials denied visas to several production staff with the Falun Gong-affiliated Shen Yun dance company, which was scheduled to perform in January 2010. Democratic Party chairman Albert Ho said the denial of the visas was a worrying new erosion of Hong Kong's freedoms and damaged the reputation of Hong Kong as a liberal and open society.

== See also ==
- Heterodox teachings (Chinese law)
