= Charlie Peng =

Chinese national

Luo Sang
- Traditional Chinese: 羅桑
- Simplified Chinese: 罗桑
Transcriptions
Standard Mandarin
- Hanyu Pinyin: Luó Sāng

Peng Zide（Charlie）
- Traditional Chinese: 彭子德 （查理）
- Simplified Chinese: 彭子德 （查理）
Transcriptions
Standard Mandarin
- Hanyu Pinyin: Péng Zidé （Chálǐ）

Luo Sang (alias Charlie Peng, real Chinese name 彭子德) is a Chinese national who was arrested by Indian authorities on charges of espionage, forgery and money laundering in 2018. After his arrest in 2018 the Indian courts let him go and expelled him from India. However he came back to India under a new identity, married a girl from Lunglei in Mizoram and continued money laundering in the Delhi. The Central Board of Direct Taxes (CBDT), caught him in raids related to a ₹1,000 crore (equivalent to ₹12 billion or US$140 million in 2023) hawala network (Note: "a remittance system that exists outside the banking structure") on 11 August 2020. He was also caught on charges of spying on the Dalai Lama and his close circle, hiring people to spy on pro-Tibetan Indians, and using the banned WeChat app to communicate.

== Life ==
According to Indian police records, Charlie Peng was born in Tibet in 1978. At the age of eight, a man, Li Peng, helped his mother and him shift to Nanjing in China. When Charlie Peng was 18, he traveled to Tibet to meet his biological father with whom he stayed with for a year. Here Peng worked as a seller of caterpillar fungus. His knowledge of Chinese helped him communicate with the Chinese and in turn helped him earn more money.

During his interrogation, Peng said that in 2009 he traveled by foot to Nepal, where he lived as a Buddhist monk at a monastery near Kathmandu, continuing to trade in caterpillar fungus. In 2014, he traveled to Delhi by bus and found a place to stay at Majnu Ka Tila, a Tibetan settlement. Peng used his monastery documents to register himself as a Tibetan refugee in the country. He soon started importing Chinese goods, allowing him to take a flat in Dwarka and then a bigger one in Gurgaon.

In September 2018 Delhi Police arrested him on charges of espionage and money laundering. However he was let go by the courts. On 11 August, during raids into Chinese entities, a hawala network that was actually a front for a US$131 million money-laundering scheme was uncovered. Over 40 fake bank accounts were linked to the scam. Sang’s Indian and Chinese associates were also put under watch.

India Today reported that the Chinese government came out with a statement, "The Chinese government has always required overseas Chinese citizens to abide by local laws and regulations. At the same time, we also require foreign governments and relevant departments to enforce the law impartially to ensure the safety and legal rights of Chinese citizens." The Taiwan Times reported that Beijing claims Luo Sang is an Indian citizen.
