= Coreu =

COREU (French: Correspondance Européenne – Telex network of European correspondents, also EUKOR-Netzwerk in Austria) is a communication network of the European Union for the communication of the Council of the European Union, the European correspondents of the foreign ministries of the EU member states, permanent representatives of member states in Brussels, the European Commission, and the General Secretariat of the Council of the European Union. The European Parliament is not among the participants.

COREU is the European equivalent of the American Secret Internet Protocol Router Network (SIPRNet, also known as Intelink-S). COREU's official aim is fast communication in case of crisis. The network enables a closer cooperation in matters regarding foreign affairs. In actuality the system's function exceeds that of mere communication, it also enables decision-making. COREU's first goal is to enable the exchange of information before and after decisions. Relaying upfront negotiations in preparation of meetings is the second goal. In addition, the system also allows the editing of documents and the decision-making, especially if there is little time. While the first two goals are preparatory measures for a shared foreign policy, the third is a methodical variant marked by practice that is defining for the image of the Common Foreign and Security Policy.

== Members ==
(The following information dates from 2013):* There is one representative in each of the capital cities in the EU.(since 1973) In Germany for example, this is the European correspondent (EU-KOR) from the Foreign Office. In Austria it is the European correspondent from the Referat II.1.a in the Federal Ministry for Europe, Integration and Foreign Affairs

- They are the correspondents (since 1982) for the European Commission
- They comprise the secretariat for the European Council
- They also make up the European External Action Service (EEAS) (responsible for foreign policy issues, since 1987)

== Data volume and technical details ==
COREU functions as a spoke-hub distribution paradigm system with the hub in Brussels. The network is operated by the European Union Intelligence and Situation Centre (formerly Joint Situation Center, JSC). The technical infrastructure is located in a building of the European Council. COREU may be described as an advanced telex system with encrypted messages via dedicated terminals. Once a message has reached the destination, it is then redistributed via the local media. In contrast, messages of governments are transmitted via local media to the correspondents and from there delivered point-to-point to Brussels via COREU.

In 2010, approximately 8500 communications had been distributed over this network.

== History ==
A telex-based communication system under the name COREU was established in 1973. Originally, only the ministries of Foreign Affairs in the European capitals were connected to it. This telex system was replaced in 1997 by the mail system CORTESY (COREU Terminal Equipment System). The name was retained despite the technical innovation.

COREU was reportedly compromised by hackers working for the People's Liberation Army Strategic Support Force, allowing for the theft of thousands of low-classified documents and diplomatic cables.
