= Tarmo Kõuts (marine scientist) =

Estonian marine scientist

Tarmo Kõuts (born 11 April 1963) is an Estonian marine scientist. On 19 March 2021, Kõuts was convicted of spying for China, and specifically for Chinese military intelligence (Intelligence Bureau of the Joint Staff).

Kõuts graduated from the University of Tartu in 1989. In 1999 he received his Ph.D in environmental physics with a thesis Processes of deep water renewal in the Baltic Sea. From 2006 Kõuts was a member of several military scientific committees including the scientific committee of NATO's Centre for Maritime Research and Experimentation of which he was the vice president from 2018 to 2020. In 2021 Kõuts pleaded guilty to conducting intelligence activities against Estonia on behalf of a foreign state and he was sentenced to three years in prison. He was accused of working for the Chinese intelligence for three years. Chinese intelligence used a think tank organisation as a cover for his recruitment in China.
