= Zhenhua Data leak =

Revelation of Chinese mass surveillance activities

Shenzhen Zhenhua Data Information Technology Co is a big data scraping company that provides open-source intelligence profiling and threat intelligence services. The company is reported to be owned by China Zhenhua Electronics Group, which is owned by China Electronics Corporation (CEC), a state-owned military research enterprise. While the data Zhenhua uses is publicly available data, Zhenhua's usage of that data is a security concern to western countries. The company claims to work with the Chinese government, including Chinese intelligence agencies and the military. Zhenhua Data's CEO has publicly supported "hybrid warfare" and "psychological warfare". Winston Peters, the Foreign Affairs Minister of New Zealand, stated that it would be 'naive' to think there was no connection to the Chinese state.

In September 2020, a data leak revealed that Zhenhua was globally monitoring over 2.4 million people. The databases, collectively called the Overseas Key Information Database (OKIDB), was leaked to an American academic who shared the data with Internet 2.0, an Australian-based cybersecurity consultancy. On 14 September 2020, a consortium of media outlets published the findings. Researchers found out that about 20% of the data was not from open source locations. Investigation by journalists in New Zealand found that some people with no online presence were profiled in the database.

There have been "conflicting assessments" of the value of the data, from it being an entirely "aspirational" venture, to it being a small peek into the world of hybrid warfare and psychological warfare being waged by the Chinese.

Internet 2.0 recovered a quarter of a million people from OKIDB, including about 52,000 Americans, 35,000 Australians and 10,000 Britons. Prominent people in the database include prime ministers Boris Johnson and Scott Morrison, the President of Austria Alexander Van der Bellen and their families. One of Hungarian Prime Minister Viktor Orbán's children appears on the list as well. Australians in the database include Natalie Imbruglia, Larry Anthony, Emma Husar, Ellen Whinnett and Junaid Thorne. Around 10,000 people and organisations from India were also on the list, including senior Indian diplomats such as Harsh Vardhan Shringla and Sanjeev Singla, policymakers such as Amitabh Kant, academics such as Romila Thapar, and sportspeople such as Sachin Tendulkar. Numerous Indian think-tanks were also being monitored.

A threat intelligence organisation published a report on Zhenhua Data's operation and found a number of monitoring systems that were publicly accessible. The report found real-time monitoring of social media such as LinkedIn, TikTok, Facebook, Twitter and online forums, and discovered an "Internet Big Data Military Intelligence System". This system tracks US warships in real-time and profiles the personnel on board, weapons being carried, LinkedIn profiles etc. This may be related to a previous story published by the NYT titled "How China Uses LinkedIn to Recruit Spies Abroad". The firm also found keywords that were being used to target US Embassy-supported activists in Hong Kong, which included political organisations, famous events and protestors.

== See also ==
- Global surveillance disclosures (2013–present)
