= CIA activities in Iran =

The Central Intelligence Agency (CIA) has repeatedly intervened in the internal affairs of Iran, from the Mosaddegh coup of 1953 to the present day. The CIA is said to have collaborated with the last Shah, Mohammad Reza Pahlavi. According to a classified report by the U.S. Senate Foreign Relations Committee, the CIA also played a key role in the formation of SAVAK, Iran’s secret police during the last Shah's regime. The agency provided funding and training to assist the Shah in establishing the organization. Its personnel may have also been involved in the Iran-Contra affair of the 1980s.

== Mosaddegh coup ==
=== Background ===
In the early 1900s, Iran's Imperial Leader awarded British businesses exclusive property rights to what would eventually become one of the world's greatest oil reserves. British investment established the Anglo-Persian Oil Company, known today as British Petroleum (BP), and in 1913, the British government purchased a majority of the stake in the partnership. By 1920, approximately 1.5 million tons of oil extracted by the Anglo-Persian oil firm yielded tremendous profits for the British, but Iran earned only 16% in royalty fees. For Mohammed Mosaddegh and many Iranians alike, the international dealings with Iran’s oil wealth were deemed exploitative. In the early 1940s, Mossadegh garnered support to champion the cause of Iranian “Self Determination.” In 1943, this charge was central in securing his election to parliament.

By 1950, 40% of U.S. and 75% of European oil was produced in Iran. In 1951, the drive for control of Iranian Oil wealth intensified with the election of Mosaddegh as the Prime Minister. As a leader of the House, he supervised and participated in the parliamentary vote that would nationalize the oil industry of Iran, thus giving them a reasonable stake in it. This move was inspired by similar oil-producing countries like Venezuela and Saudi Arabia who earned 50% from their relative oil profit. To the West and the CIA in particular, such development was attributed to Mosaddegh’s quest for personal power, governing with irresponsible, emotional policies, in detriment to the Shah and the Iranian Army.

==== Oil nationalization and Western response ====
By the end of the year 1952, it had become clear that the Mosaddegh government threatened the interests of the Western countries while gradually leaning towards the Soviets. Britain protested Mosaddegh's actions in the UN court but lost their case. In a further affront to the Mosaddegh regime, the British government imposed heavy economic sanctions and embargoes on Iranian oil, while also succeeding in halting trade between Iran and neighboring countries, like Saudi Arabia. Despite these hardships, Mosaddegh refused to abandon his stance.

In 1952, Britain approached the U.S. with a plan for a coup and pressed to mount a joint operation, to remove the democratically elected Prime Minister Mohammed Mosaddegh and install the autocratic Shah, Mohammed Reza Pahlavi to rule Iran. Representatives of British Intelligence met with CIA representatives in Washington, November and December of that year, to discuss battle and stay-behind plans in Iran. Although it was not on the posted agenda of the meeting, British Intelligence representatives proposed action to remove Prime Minister Mosaddegh. However, with Harry Truman as U.S. president, his administration was neither ready to start a new conflict nor join the British Secret Intelligence Services (SIS) in removing Mosaddeqh from office. The U.S. position at the time was, the democratic Mosaddegh was the best deterrent to communist influence in Iran.

With Eisenhower becoming president in January 1953, fearing a possible alliance between Iran and the Soviet Union, such a joint operation between the CIA and ISS seemed possible.

Plan Y was an operation that would have consisted of a three-part attack. These three parts would involve an assault on land, air, and sea. Britain attempted to seek aid from the United States under the Truman administration, but the U.S. declined since any armed military aggression could lead to an open conflict with the Soviet Union. In March 1953, the CIA began to draft a plan to overthrow Mosaddegh, called Operation AJAX which later became the TRAJAX.

=== Plotting The Coup ===
Planning the operation

On April 4, 1953, the CIA approved a $1 million budget for a covert operation to remove Prime Minister Mohammed Mosaddegh. A planning study completed on April 16 concluded that cooperation between the Shah and General Fazlollah Zahedi, supported by CIA funding and local contacts, could succeed by encouraging public unrest and weakening military support for Mosaddegh. U.S. officials also cited concerns about the influence of the communist Tudeh Party, the Soviet Union and Western oil interests.

The operation was based on a British proposal known as Plan Y and was renamed Operation Ajax (TPAJAX). Brigadier General Norman Schwarzkopf Sr. and CIA officer Kermit Roosevelt Jr. were assigned key roles. On June 22, CIA officials George Carroll and Donald Wilber were tasked with planning the military and psychological components. The operation received approval from the U.S. State Department and the British Foreign Office in mid-July 1953 and was coordinated through the US Embassy in Tehran.

Operation Ajax aimed to remove Mosaddegh, restore the Shah’s authority, and install a new government led by Zahedi. The plan focused on four elements: a propaganda campaign against Mosaddegh, efforts to create internal unrest, pressure on the Shah to appoint a new prime minister, and support for Zahedi as Mosaddegh’s replacement.

To secure the Shah’s cooperation, U.S. and British officials worked through his twin sister, Princess Ashraf, using a series of meetings to reassure him of Western support and obtain his formal approval for Zahedi’s appointment.

CIA propaganda in Iran - "Mosaddegh's Spy Service"

CIA propaganda in Iran: "Our National Character"

Propaganda and psychological operations

The CIA prepared and released propaganda to undermine Mosaddegh's political position. One of these, called "Mosaddeq’s Spy Service", claimed that Mosaddegh had built up an extensive spy service of his own to bolster himself as dictator. Another piece, titled "Our National Character," claimed that Mosaddegh's alliance with the Tudeh Party was "corrupting the character of the Iranian people." Furthermore, an internal CIA memo entitled "Campaign to Install Pro-Western Government In Iran" specifies that one of the CIA's main goals in Iran was to "disenchant the Iranian population with the myth of Mossadeq's patriotism, by exposing his collaboration with the Communists and his manipulation of constitutional authority to serve his own personal ambitions for power."

Execution of Operation Ajax

Operation Ajax was put into motion the following year in June, starting with the arrival of key figures, such as Norman Schwarzkopf and Kermit Roosevelt, into Iran. This was a covert operation with the goal of removing Mosaddegh, and then reinstating Shah Mohammad Reza Pahlavi. In the leadup to the operation's execution, officials such as Kermit Roosevelt met with the Shah to discuss the plan and prepare propaganda. However, the operation was initially unsuccessful after the soldiers sent to dismiss Mosaddegh on August 15, 1953, were stopped before the operation could move forward. According to Donald Wilber, one of the CIA operatives who planned the coup and wrote the CIA history on the operation, there were conflicting reports on what occurred that day and how the operation was unable to be completed. The statement released by Mosaddegh's group claimed that the soldiers had been arrested by his personal guards. Kermit Roosevelt, the grandson of former President Theodore Roosevelt, and head of CIA operations in the Middle East; with the cooperation of the Department of State, had articles planted in the United States but when reproduced in Iran, it had psychological effects in Iran and contributed to the coup. With Mosaddegh resisting British pressure, the United States entered the conflict, lured by the prospect of controlling a greater portion of Iran's oil supplies. Mosaddegh's reputation was damaged by propaganda campaigns that incorrectly associated him with communism and denigrated the Iranian people. An attempt to overthrow the democratically elected leader was set in motion.

A notable, effective cause for public unease with Mosaddegh's leadership was the letter that President Eisenhower sent him in response to his call to the U.S. for economic aid, due to not agreeing to the British oil deal. Eisenhower writes "The failure of Iran and of the United Kingdom to reach an agreement with regard to compensation has handicapped the Government of the United States in its efforts to help Iran." According to CIA reports, this succeeded in weakening Mosaddegh's position and turned the media, the Parliament, and the populace against him. The CIA also increased their propaganda campaign to link Mosaddegh to communists, with Kermit Roosevelt paying a group of people to act as a mob supporting the Tudeh party and Mosaddegh, rioting in Tehran. This was done after the first failed coup attempt and used the rising tensions following the aftermath to create unrest to support the second attempt. In an attempt at a second coup, the CIA began to bribe the army and police officials. For Zahedi to receive the financial assistance he badly needed, the CIA made 5 million dollars available within two days of Zahedi's assumption of power. After several attempts and over 7 million dollars were spent, operations to overthrow Mosaddegh were completed Zahedi immediately implemented martial law and began executing nationalist leaders. Zahedi had accomplished this by coming out of hiding from the U.S. Embassy and immediately drove to the nearest radio station to publicly announce his takeover. This ensued with the Imperial Guards launching the assault on Mosaddegh's house with tanks, artillery, and bazookas. Mosaddegh again had fled over the back wall of his house, escaping death again. Mosaddegh was spared from execution by serving 3 years in solitary confinement and after he remained on house arrest until his death.

Aftermath

The Coup in Iran was the CIA's first successful coup operation. Mosaddegh was removed from power and Iran's oil shares were split amongst the British, French, and United States for a 25-year agreement in which Iran would earn 50% of the oil profits. Britain earned 40% of the oil shares, the Dutch Oil Company, Shell received 14%, French CFP received 6%, and the United States received the remaining 40%. Quickly following the removal of Mosaddegh in 1953, the U.S. installed a pro-U.S. dictator, Shah Mohammad Reza Pahlavi. Over the next decades, the Shah increased the economic strength of Iran but he also repressed political dissent. He accomplished this through the use of a secret police force known as the SAVAK, which was created with the support of the CIA and Mossad. The Shah was accused by many of trying to get rid of Islam, even though the country's population was over 90% Muslim. This eventually led to the rise of political Islam in Iran. In a speech on March 17, 2000, before the American Iranian Council on the relaxation of U.S. sanctions against Iran, Secretary of State Madeleine Albright said: "In 1953, the United States played a significant role in orchestrating the overthrow of Iran's popular prime minister, Mohammed Mosaddegh. As the CIA's first successful coup, Operation Ajax left Iran with a resentment for the U.S. that would lead directly to conflicts such as the Iran hostage crisis. The aftershocks of these events continue to influence Iran's political and cultural landscape today.

=== Overthrow of Premier Mosaddegh of Iran (Memo) ===
Further proof of the United States' involvement was announced on March 19, 2013, the 60th anniversary of the overthrow, when the National Security Service posted recently declassified documents that the CIA had on the coup. Although previous to this the CIA claimed that all the documents about 1953 were destroyed or lost in the 1960s because of lack of storage space. A 200-page report written by Donald Wilbur for the CIA goes into detail regarding the planning, execution, and result of the coup. Wilbur's report Overthrow of Premier Mossadeq of Iran: November 1952 - August 1953 attempts to outline the need for proper representation of the coup and the necessity to expose the CIA operations in Iran. Released by the New York Times on April 16, 2000, the newspaper utilized Wilbur's writing and reported the facts behind the reason for a coup. He argues that due to the emotional instability of Mosaddegh the Iranian government, military, and Shah were at risk of Soviet takeover and the possibility of communist influence. Thus beginning the aim to crush the communist parties and prevent the 'Reds' from infiltrating the British and American stronghold in Iran.

== SAVAK ==
In 1973 the CIA moved its Headquarters overseeing the Middle East from Cyprus to Tehran, with the appointment of Richard Helms as U.S. Ambassador to Iran. They also trained over 400 SAVAK officers a year near Mclean, Virginia. They were taught surveillance and intel collection techniques according to John Ghazvinian.

== Reconnaissance of USSR ==
Through the Cold War in the 1960s and 1970s, the CIA used its alliance with the government of Iran to acquire an advantage over their Soviet counterparts with the Iranian airfields, airspace, and Air Force assets for aggressive, airborne reconnaissance missions along the edge of the Soviet territories and Warsaw Pact countries in Project Dark Gene. The advantage gained over their Soviet counterparts was crucial to the almost daily sorties that were flown near the borders of the USSR and Warsaw Pact countries. Below there is a map of the USSR highlighted in green. You can see the Middle Eastern States that border the far southern Soviet States, which helps us to identify the motives for the U.S. and the American intelligence community's obsession over states such as Iran. By allowing American military and spy forces to stage in northern Iran, it would ensure less likely suicide missions and more friendly airspace. This helped to keep the number of pilots and personnel killed in action to a minimum. During the 1970s, Iran maintained a good relationship with the United States, which allowed the U.S. to install long-range radar technology and establish listening posts enabling the U.S. to monitor activities in the Soviet Union.

Information of the KGB USSR to the International Department of the CC CPSU, October 10, 1979. "The Leadership of Iran About the External Security of the Country" "According to KGB information, in August in Teheran a secret meeting was held with the participation of representatives of the Prime Minister, the Ministries of Foreign and Internal Affairs, the Intelligence and Operational Administrations of the General Staff, Gendarme and Police Administrations of the General Staff and the Staff of the "Corps of Defenders of the Revolution," with the goal of studying issues which touch on the security of Iran. It was noted that the USSR and the US, which have their own interests in this region, are worried about the victory of the Islamic revolution in Iran.~ presumed that the USA might resort to a direct military threat and realization of a blockade. But if Iran will not take sharp steps which hurt the US, and will obstruct the penetration of the Soviets, this will ease the position of the USA. Evaluating the policy of the USSR in relation to the Iranian regime, the participants in the meeting concluded that insofar as strengthening the Islamic republic will lead to a weakening of the position of the regime in Afghanistan, exert a certain influence on the Muslim republics in the USSR and will be "a brake in the path of penetration of Communism in the region," the Soviet Union "will not turn away from the ideological struggle and efforts to put into power in Iran a leftist government." It was stressed that with the aim of weakening the Islamic regime the USSR might organize "provocative" activity among Iranian Kurds, Azeris, Turkmen, Baluchis, support leftist forces, create economic difficulties, resort to a military threat based on the agreement of 1921. It was noted that Afghanistan is not in any condition to undertake military actions against Iran. However, border conflicts are not excluded. In addition, Afghanistan needs economic assistance from Iran, which might soften its position. The positions of Iraq, Turkey, Pakistan, and Saudi Arabia were also analyzed." Based on research notes taken at the Center for the Preservation of Contemporary Documentation (Moscow), Fond 5, Opis 76, File 1355, Pages 17-20.

== Iran hostage crisis ==
In November 1979, a group of Islamist students and militants took over the American embassy in support of the Iranian Revolution. Operation Eagle Claw was the unsuccessful United States military operation that attempted to rescue the 52 hostages from the U.S. Embassy in Tehran, Iran on April 24, 1980. Several SAC/SOG teams infiltrated into Tehran to support this operation.

== Identification of leftists ==
Following the Iranian Revolution of 1979, which overthrew the Pahlavi dynasty and installed the theocratic regime of Ayatollah Ruhollah Khomeini, the CIA maintained its interest in the remnants of the Tudeh Party. A 1981 CIA report warned that "since the collapse of the Pahlavi monarchy, the pro-Soviet, Communist Tudeh Party has emerged from years of repression and exile to become a small but influential political force in Iran." According to that same report, the CIA was aware that the hardline Islamist policies of the new Iranian government were likely to alienate the population, thus broadening the appeal of the Tudeh Party, while also noting that the party "also benefits from the continuing decay of the Iranian economy, which alienates more and more Iranians from the mullahs' mismanagement." Anticipating that the Tudeh would "bide its time and prepare for the day—perhaps Khomeini's death—when a challenge to the regime could have some chance of success," the CIA opted to aid the Khomeini government in its suppression of leftists. In 1983, the CIA passed an extensive list of Iranian communists and other leftists secretly working in the Iranian government to Khomeini's administration. A Tower Commission report later observed that the list was utilized to take "measures, including mass executions, that virtually eliminated the pro-Soviet infrastructure in Iran."

== Iran-Contra affair ==
Beginning in August 1984, senior Reagan administration officials, in the Iran-Contra affair, arranged for the indirect transfer of arms to Iran, to circumvent the Boland Amendments. These amendments were intended to prevent the expenditure of US funds to support the Nicaraguan Contras. Since the arms-for-hostages deal struck by the Reagan Administration channeled money to the Contras, the legal interpretation of the time was that the CIA, as an organization, could not participate in Iran-Contra.

The relationships, first to avoid the Boland Amendment restriction, but also for operational security, did not directly give or sell U.S. weapons to Iran. Instead, the Reagan Administration authorized Israel to sell munitions to Iran, using contracted Iranian arms broker Manucher Ghorbanifar. The Reagan administration circumvented the law by using Israel and South Africa to send weapons to Iran. To finance the Contras, the United States used the money from the weaponry sales and sent it to the Contras. The proceeds from the sales, less the 41% markup charged by Ghorbanifar and originally at a price not acceptable to Iran, went directly to the Contras. Those proceeds were not interpreted as U.S. funds. The Administration resupplied Israel, which was not illegal, with munitions that replaced those transferred to Iran.

While Director of Central Intelligence (DCI) William Casey was deeply involved in Iran-Contra, Casey, a World War II Office of Strategic Services (OSS) clandestine operations officer, ran the Iran operation with people outside the CIA, such as White House/National Security Council employees such as John Poindexter and Oliver North, as well as retired special operations personnel such as John K. Singlaub and Richard Secord.

The scandal was ultimately compounded by a failure of the US to hide its delivery of weapons to the Iranians.The principal objective of North's clandestine mission was to deliver eight hundred antiquated missiles on an EL Al 747 to Lisbon, where they would then be transferred to a Nicaraguan plane secured by General Richard Secord. Secord's role in the mission was to then take the missiles to Tehran. CIA officials, most notably Duane Clarridge, worked around the clock to secure a better way of delivery. In late November 1985, a CIA 707 was secured from Frankfurt to deliver eighteen HAWK missiles to the Iranians on Monday, November 25. The plan required proof of presidential backing, which, due to the timing of the events, required a retroactive signature authorizing, "the provision of assistance by the Central Intelligence Agency to private parties in their attempt to obtain the release of Americans held hostage in the Middle East." The document was signed by Reagan on December 5, 1985.

The United States was convicted of violating international law by the International Court of Justice in the 1986 case of Nicaragua v. United States. The US had been caught illegal funding the Contras, contributing to Nicaraguan Contras, supporting a campaign of international force, or "state-sponsored international terrorism." The US ignored the ruling and refused to participate or pay the reparations that had been ordered by the court.

== Intelligence Analysis ==
The Islamic Republic of Iran, or more commonly known by its shorthand name Iran, was described as a problem area in the February 2005 report by Porter Goss, then CIA Director, to the Senate Intelligence Committee. "In early February, the spokesman of Iran's Supreme Council for National Security publicly announced that Iran would never scrap its nuclear program. This came amid negotiations with EU-3 members (Britain, Germany, and France) seeking objective guarantees from Tehran that it will not use nuclear technology for nuclear weapons. This is unsurprising given the political instability that has gripped the nation since the US and British intervention in 1953, and the shaky economic conditions that have gripped the nation for decades. Iran's economy is almost completely dependent on foreign oil exports, and its government is racked with blatant and open corruption.

"Previous comments by Iranian officials, including Iran's Supreme Leader and its Foreign Minister, indicated that Iran would not give up its ability to enrich uranium. Certainly, they can use it to produce fuel for power reactors. We are more concerned about the dual-use nature of the technology that could also be used to achieve a nuclear weapon.

"In parallel, Iran continues its pursuit of long-range ballistic missiles, such as an improved version of its 1,300 km range Shahab-3 medium-range ballistic missile (MRBM), to add to the hundreds of short-range SCUD missiles it already has.

"Even since 9/11, Tehran continues to support terrorist groups in the region, such as Hizballah, and could encourage increased attacks in Israel and the Palestinian Territories to derail progress toward peace. Iran reportedly is supporting some anti-Coalition activities in Iraq and seeking to influence the future character of the Iraqi state. Iran continues to retain in secret important members of Al-Qai'ida-the Management Council—causing further uncertainty about Iran's commitment to bring them to justice.

"Conservatives are likely to consolidate their power in Iran's June 2005 presidential elections, further marginalizing the reform movement last year."

== Alleged support for terrorist groups ==
During 2007–2008, there were allegations that the CIA was supporting the Sunni terrorist group Jundallah, but these claims were debunked by a subsequent investigation showing that the CIA "had barred even the most incidental contact with Jundallah." The rumors originated in an Israeli Mossad "false flag" operation; Mossad agents posing as CIA officers met with and recruited members of Jundullah in cities such as London to carry out attacks against Iran. President George W. Bush "went absolutely ballistic" when he learned of Israel's actions, but the situation was not resolved until President Barack Obama's administration "drastically scaled back joint U.S.-Israel intelligence programs targeting Iran" and ultimately designated Jundallah a terrorist organization in November 2010. Although the CIA cut all ties with Jundallah after the 2007 Zahedan bombings, the Federal Bureau of Investigation (FBI) and United States Department of Defense continued to gather intelligence on Jundallah through assets cultivated by "FBI counterterrorism task force officer" Thomas McHale; the CIA co-authorized a 2008 trip McHale made to meet his informants in Afghanistan. According to The New York Times: "Current and former officials say the American government never directed or approved any Jundallah operations. And they say there was never a case when the United States was told the timing and target of a terrorist attack yet took no action to prevent it."

== Operation Merlin ==
Operation Merlin was a United States covert operation under the Clinton Administration to provide Iran with a flawed design for a component of a nuclear weapon ostensibly in order to delay the alleged Iranian nuclear weapons program or to frame Iran.

In his book State of War, author and intelligence correspondent for The New York Times James Risen relates that the CIA chose a defected Russian nuclear scientist to provide deliberately flawed nuclear warhead blueprints to Iranian officials in February 2000. Risen wrote in his book that President Clinton had approved the operation and that the Bush administration later endorsed the plan. Earlier publication of details on Operation Merlin by the New York Times in 2003 was prevented by the intervention of National Security Advisor Condoleezza Rice with the NYT's Executive Editor Howell Raines.

Operation Merlin backfired when the CIA's Russian contact/messenger noticed flaws in the schematics and told the Iranian nuclear scientists. Instead of crippling Iran's nuclear program, the book alleges, Operation Merlin may have accelerated it by providing useful information: once the flaws were identified, the plans could be compared with other sources, such as those presumed to have been provided to the Iranians by A. Q. Khan.

== Sabotage of Iran's nuclear program ==
=== Operation Olympic Games ===
Operation Olympic Games was a covert and still unacknowledged campaign of sabotage by means of cyber disruption, directed at Iranian nuclear facilities by the United States and likely Israel. As reported, it is one of the first known uses of offensive cyber weapons. Starting under the administration of George W. Bush in 2006, the Olympic Games were accelerated under President Obama, who heeded Bush's advice to continue cyber attacks on the Iranian nuclear facility at Natanz. Bush believed that the strategy was the only way to prevent an Israeli conventional strike on Iranian nuclear facilities.

During Bush's second term, General James Cartwright along with other intelligence officials presented Bush with a sophisticated code that would act as an offensive cyber weapon. "The goal was to gain access to the Natanz plant's industrial computer controls ... the computer code would invade the specialized computers that command the centrifuges." Collaboration happened with Israel's SIGINT intelligence service, Unit 8200. Israel's involvement was important to the Americans because the former had "deep intelligence about operations at Natanz that would be vital to making the cyber attack a success." Additionally, American officials wanted to "dissuade the Israelis from carrying out their own preemptive strike against Iranian nuclear facilities." To prevent a conventional strike, Israel had to be deeply involved in Operation Olympic Games. The computer virus created by the two countries became known as "the bug," and Stuxnet by the IT community once it became public. The malicious software temporarily halted approximately 1,000 of the 5,000 centrifuges from spinning at Natanz.

A programming error in "the bug" caused it to spread to computers outside of Natanz. When an engineer "left Natanz and connected [his] computer to the Internet, the American- and Israeli-made bug failed to recognize that its environment had changed." The code replicated on the Internet and was subsequently exposed for public dissemination. IT security firms Symantec and Kaspersky Lab have since examined Stuxnet. It is unclear whether the Americans or Israelis introduced the programming error.

According to the Atlantic Monthly, Operation Olympic Games is "probably the most significant covert manipulation of the electromagnetic spectrum since World War II. The New Yorker claims Operation Olympic Games is "the first formal offensive act of pure cyber sabotage by the United States against another country if you do not count electronic penetrations that have preceded conventional military attacks, such as that of Iraq's military computers before the invasion of 2003."

The Washington Post reported that Flame malware was also part of the Olympic Games.

Leak investigation In June 2013, it was reported that Cartwright was the target of a year-long investigation by the US Department of Justice into the leak of classified information about the operation to the US media. In March 2015, it was reported that the investigation had stalled amid concerns that necessary evidence for prosecution was too sensitive to reveal in court.

=== Stuxnet ===
Stuxnet is a malicious computer worm believed to be a jointly built American-Israeli cyber weapon. Although neither state has confirmed this openly, anonymous US officials speaking to The Washington Post claimed the worm was developed during the Obama administration to sabotage Iran’s nuclear program with what would seem like a long series of unfortunate accidents.

Stuxnet is typically introduced to the target environment via an infected USB flash drive. The worm then propagates across the network, scanning for Siemens Step7 software on computers controlling a PLC. In the absence of either criterion, Stuxnet becomes dormant inside the computer. If both conditions are fulfilled, Stuxnet introduces the infected rootkit onto the PLC and Step7 software, modifying the codes and giving unexpected commands to the PLC while returning a loop of normal operations system values feedback to the users.

The worm initially spreads indiscriminately but includes a highly specialized malware payload that is designed to target only Siemens supervisory control and data acquisition (SCADA) systems that are configured to control and monitor specific industrial processes. Stuxnet infects PLCs by subverting the Step-7 software application that is used to reprogram these devices.

Different variants of Stuxnet targeted five Iranian organizations, with the probable target widely suspected to be uranium enrichment infrastructure in Iran; Symantec noted in August 2010 that 60% of the infected computers worldwide were in Iran. Siemens stated that the worm has not caused any damage to its customers, but the Iran nuclear program, which uses embargoed Siemens equipment procured secretly, has been damaged by Stuxnet. Kaspersky Lab concluded that the sophisticated attack could only have been conducted "with nation-state support". This was further supported by the F-Secure's chief researcher Mikko Hyppönen who commented in a Stuxnet FAQ, "That's what it would look like, yes".

On 1 June 2012, an article in The New York Times said that Stuxnet is part of a US and Israeli intelligence operation called "Operation Olympic Games", started under President George W. Bush and expanded under President Barack Obama.

On 24 July 2012, an article by Chris Matyszczyk from CNET reported how the Atomic Energy Organization of Iran e-mailed F-Secure's chief research officer Mikko Hyppönen to report a new instance of malware.

On 25 December 2012, an Iranian semi-official news agency announced there was a cyberattack by Stuxnet, this time on the industries in the southern area of the country. The virus targeted a power plant and some other industries in Hormozgan province in recent months.

A study of the spread of Stuxnet by Symantec showed that the main affected countries in the early days of the infection were Iran, Indonesia and India:

Country	Share of infected computers
Iran	58.85%
Indonesia	18.22%
India	8.31%
Azerbaijan	2.57%
United States	1.56%
Pakistan	1.28%
Other countries	9.2%

Iran was reported to have "beefed up" its cyber-war capabilities following the Stuxnet attack and has been suspected of retaliatory attacks against US banks.

In a March 2012 interview with CBS News' "60 Minutes", retired USAF General Michael Hayden – who served as director of both the Central Intelligence Agency and National Security Agency – while denying knowledge of who created Stuxnet said that he believed it had been "a good idea" but that it carried a downside in that it had legitimized the use of sophisticated cyberweapons designed to cause physical damage. Hayden said, "There are those out there who can take a look at this... and maybe even attempt to turn it to their own purposes". In the same report, Sean McGurk, a former cybersecurity official at the Department of Homeland Security noted that the Stuxnet source code could now be downloaded online and modified to be directed at new target systems. Speaking of the Stuxnet creators, he said, "They opened the box. They demonstrated the capability... It's not something that can be put back." A Wired magazine article about US General Keith B. Alexander stated: "And he and his cyberwarriors have already launched their first attack. The cyberweapon that came to be known as Stuxnet was created and built by the NSA in partnership with the CIA and Israeli intelligence in the mid-2000s."

=== Duqu ===
On 1 September 2011, a new worm was found, thought to be related to Stuxnet. The Laboratory of Cryptography and System Security (CrySyS) of the Budapest University of Technology and Economics analyzed the malware, naming the threat "Duqu". Symantec, based on this report, continued the analysis of the threat, calling it "nearly identical to Stuxnet, but with a completely different purpose", and published a detailed technical paper. The main component used in Duqu is designed to capture information such as keystrokes and system information. The exfiltrated data may be used to enable a future Stuxnet-like attack. On 28 December 2011, Kaspersky Lab's director of global research and analysis spoke to Reuters about recent research results showing that the platforms Stuxnet and Duqu both originated in 2007, and are being referred to as Tilded due to the ~d at the beginning of the file names. Also uncovered in this research was the possibility of three more variants based on the Tilded platform.

=== Flame ===
In May 2012, the new malware "Flame" was found, thought to be related to Stuxnet. Researchers named the program "Flame" after the name of one of its modules. After analyzing the code of Flame, Kaspersky Lab said that there is a strong relationship between Flame and Stuxnet. An early version of Stuxnet contained code to propagate infections via USB drives that are nearly identical to a Flame module that exploits the same vulnerability.

=== Stars ===
The Stars virus is a computer virus that infects computers running Microsoft Windows. It was named and discovered by Iranian authorities in April 2011. Iran claimed it was used as a tool to commit espionage. Western researchers came to believe it is probably the same thing as the Duqu virus, part of the Stuxnet attack on Iran.

== Abandoned spies ==
In September 2022, Reuters reported that the United States had employed websites disguised as fan pages focused on subjects such as Iranian soccer (Iraniangoals.com) or Johnny Carson to communicate with spies. These sites used fake search bars, which upon the entry of a password, would convert to a page upon which the spy could communicate with the CIA. These sites were poorly built, and their secretive functions were not well-disguised. Reuters reported that this led to the imprisonment of spies such as Gholamreza Hosseini, an engineer. Hosseini was jailed for almost a decade, and did not hear from the CIA after release.

== See also ==
- Mossad activities in Iran
- Manufactured Crisis: The Untold Story of the Iran Nuclear Scare
- The CIA Insider's Guide to the Iran Crisis
