= CPLINK =

Microsoft Windows shortcut icon vulnerability

CPLINK and Win32/CplLnk.A are names for a Microsoft Windows shortcut icon vulnerability discovered in June 2010 and patched on 2 August that affected all Windows operating systems. The vulnerability is exploitable when any Windows application that displays shortcut icons, such as Windows Explorer, browses to a folder containing a malicious shortcut. The exploit can be triggered without any user interaction, regardless where the shortcut file is located.

In June 2010, VirusBlokAda reported detection of zero-day attack malware called Stuxnet that exploited the vulnerability to install a rootkit that snooped Siemens' SCADA systems WinCC and PCS 7. According to Symantec it is the first worm designed to reprogram industrial systems and not only to spy on them.
