= Stars virus =

Computer virus

The Stars virus is a computer virus which infects computers running Microsoft Windows. It was named and discovered by Iranian authorities in April 2011. Iran claimed it was used as a tool to commit espionage. Western researchers believes that it is probably the same virus as the Duqu, part of the Stuxnet attack on Iran.

== History ==
The Stars virus was studied only in an Iranian laboratory, with other cybersecurity organizations not having access to samples, and therefore not being able to compare it to Duqu, Stuxnet, or any other known malware. Foreign computer experts say they have seen no evidence of the virus, and some even doubt its actual existence. Iran is claiming Stars to be harmful for computer systems. It is said to inflict minor damage in the initial stage and might be mistaken for executable files of governmental organizations.

This is the second attack claimed by Iran after the Stuxnet, a computer worm discovered in July 2010 that targeted industrial software and equipment.

Researchers came to believe that the Stars virus found by Iranian computer specialists was the Duqu virus. The Duqu virus keylogger was embedded in a JPEG file. Since most of the file was taken by the keylogger only a portion of the image remained. It turned out to be an image taken by the Hubble telescope showing a cluster of stars, the aftermath of two galaxies colliding. Symantec, Kaspersky and CrySyS researchers came to believe Duqu and Stars were the same virus.

== See also ==
- Flame (malware)
- Cyber security standards
- Cyber warfare
- List of cyber attack threat trends
- Proactive Cyber Defence
