= Guardian Analytics =

Technology company

Nice Actimize (Formerly Guardian Analytics)
- Company type: Private
- Founded: 2005
- Headquarters: Mountain View, California, U.S.
- Key people: Eric Tran-Le, GM
- Products: Online Banking Security; Real-time Payment Fraud Protection
- Website: www.guardiananalytics.com

Guardian Analytics, based in Mountain View, California, is a privately held company which provides behavioral analytics and machine learning technology for preventing banking fraud. It was established in 2005 and its products are based on anomaly detection to monitor financial transactions.

The company was acquired by Nice Actimize acquired August 2020.

== History ==
Guardian Analytics was founded in 2005 by Tom Miltonberger.

In 2012, Guardian Analytics, together with McAfee, dissected the US$78 million cyber attack titled Operation High Roller.

In 2013, Guardian Analytics was listed among the Top 10 Influencers in banking information security.

In June 2020, NICE Ltd. announced the acquisition of Guardian Analytics.

Between November 2022 and January 2023, Guardian Analytics was the victim of a data breach, which impacted approximately 150,000 Webster Bank customers who had sensitive personal information, including bank account and social security numbers, compromised.

== Services ==
Guardian Analytics offers fraud prevention services for financial institutions. The general architecture includes two main components. The first component, the risk engine, merges analytics and behavior-based models of a user to create a probabilistic profile of each individual. Guardian Analytics is marketed as software as a service and can be deployed in the company's SAS 70 Type II certified environment.

The software is transparent to account holders and does not require any action on their side.

=== FraudDESK ===
FraudDESK is a fraud monitoring managed service.

== See also ==
- Internet fraud
- Cyber-collection
- Operation High Roller
