= Harvey Rishikof =

American lawyer

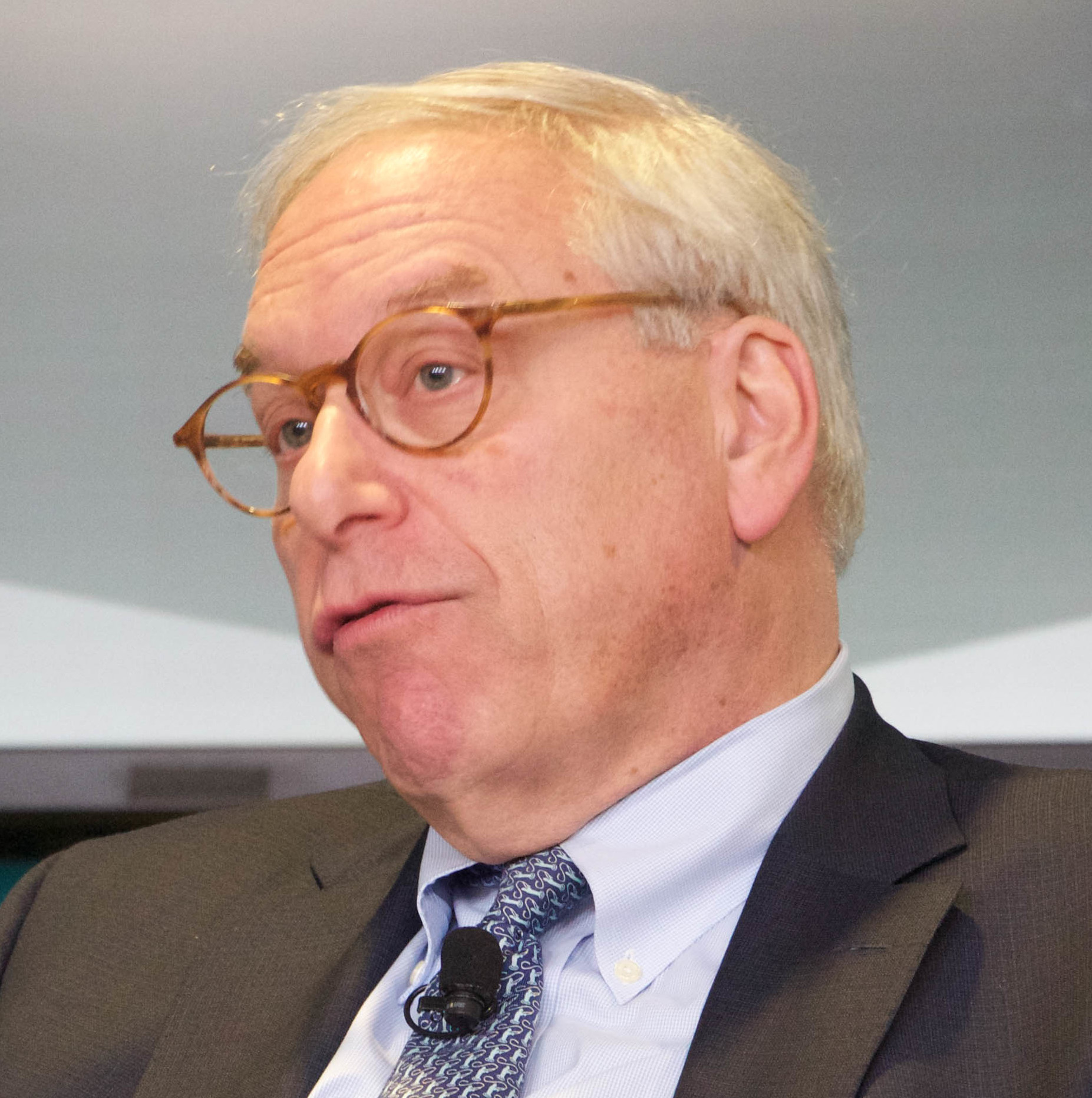
- Harvey Rishikof in 2017
- Occupations: law professor, government official
- Known for: Tried to negotiate plea deals with the suspect charged at the Guantanamo military commissions

Harvey Rishikof is an American lawyer who was the Convening Authority for the Guantanamo military commission in 2017 and early 2018.

Rishikof was the previous chair of the American Bar Association's Standing Committee on Law and National Security. In 2020 he was a visiting professor at Temple University.

His past positions include:

- dean of the National War College;
- senior policy advisor to the Director of National Counterintelligence, ODNI;
- legal counsel for the deputy director of the Federal Bureau of Investigation;
- dean of Roger Williams University School of Law

== Convening authority, Guantanamo ==
Rishikof and his deputy, Air Force Colonel Gary Brown were dismissed early in 2018.

A former prosecutor, Morris Davis, made a comparison between the Donald Trump Presidency and a sports team firing its coach.

Think about that for a moment. If a professional football team was on its seventh head coach and sixth quarterback in less than a dozen years, that team would almost certainly be a loser.

Rishikof and Brown had been negotiating with the suspects' lawyers, offering to take the death penalty off the table, if they agreed to plead guilty, and accept a life sentence.

== Publications ==
- Harvey Rishikof (2008). "Combating Terrorism in the Digital Age: A Clash of Doctrines: The Frontier of Sovereignty - National Security and Citizenship - The Fourth Amendment - Technology and Shifting Legal Borders". Miss. L.J. 78: 381.
- Christopher S. Allen; Harvey Rishikof (Winter 1985). "Tale Thrice Told: A Review of Industrial Policy Proposals". Journal of Policy Analysis and Management. 4 (2): 234–249. doi:10.2307/3324626. JSTOR 3324626.
- CW Nihan; H Rishikof (1993). "Rethinking the Federal Court System: Thinking the Unthinkable". Miss. C. L. Rev. 14: 349.
- Rishikof, Harvey (1994). "Separateness but Interdependence, Autonomy but Reciprocity: A First Look at Federal Judges' Appearances before Legislative Committees". Mercer Law Review. 46: 667.
- "Is It Time for a Federal Terrorist Court: Terrorists and Prosecutions: Problems, Paradigms, and Paradoxes". Suffolk J. Trial & App. Advoc. 2003.
- H Rishikof (2003). "Framing International Rights with a Janusism Edge-Foreign Policy and Class Actions-Legal Institutions as Soft Power". University of Chicago Legal Forum. 1.
- Harvey Rishikof (2004). "When Naked Came the Doctrine of "Self-Defense": What Is the Proper Role of the International Court of Justice in Use of Force Cases?". Yale Journal of International Law.
- Harvey Rishikof (Summer 2006). "Long Wars of Political Order - Sovereignty and Choice: The Fourth Amendment and the Modern Trilemma". Cornell Journal of Law and Public Policy. 15 (3).
- Kevin E. Lunday; Harvey Riskikof (2008). "Due Process Is a Strategic Choice: Legitimacy and the Establishment of an Article III National Security Court". Cal. W. Int'l L.J.
- William E. Nelson; Harvey Rishikof; I. Scott Messinger; Michael Jo (November 2009). "The Liberal Tradition of the Supreme Court Clerkship: Its Rise, Fall, and Reincarnation?" (PDF). Vanderbilt Law Review. 62 (6): 1749–1814. Archived from the original (PDF) on 2010-07-27.
- Harvey Rishikof; Stewart Abercrombie Baker; Bernard Horowitz (2012). Harvey Rishikof; Stewart Abercrombie Baker; Bernard Horowitz (eds.). Patriots Debate: Contemporary Issues in National Security Law. American Bar Association. ISBN 9781614385905.
- Andrew Borene; Adam Pearlman; Harvey Rishikof (2015). Andrew Borene; Adam Pearlman; Harvey Rishikof (eds.). The U.S. Intelligence Community Law Sourcebook: A Compendium of National Security Related Laws and Policy Documents. American Bar Association. ISBN 9781627224680.
- Roger Z. George; Harvey Rishikof, eds. (2017). The National Security Enterprise: Navigating the Labyrinth. Georgetown University Press. ISBN 9781626164406.
