= Operation High Roller =

Global cyber attack in the banking system

Operation High Roller was a series of fraud in the banking system in different parts of the world that used cyber-collection agents in order to collect PC and smart-phone information to electronically raid bank accounts. It was dissected in 2012 by McAfee and Guardian Analytics. A total of roughly $78 million was siphoned out of bank accounts due to this attack. The attackers were operating from servers in Russia, Albania and China to carry out electronic fund transfers.

== Specifications ==
This cyber attack is described to have the following features:

- Bypassed Chip and PIN authentication.
- Required no human participation.
- Instruction came from cloud-based servers (rather than the hacker's PC) to further hide the identity of the attacker.
- Included elements of "insider levels of understanding".
- Banks in Europe, the United States and Colombia were targeted.
- Impacted several classes of financial institution such as credit unions, large global banks, regional banks, and high-net-worth individuals.

While some sources have suggested it to be an extension of man-in-the-browser attack Operation High Roller is reported to have harnessed a more extensive level of automation distinguishing it from the traditional methods.

== See also ==
- Bundestrojaner
- Cyber-collection
- Duqu
- Flame
- Guardian Analytics
- McAfee
- Stuxnet
