= Gary D. Brown =

American lawyer

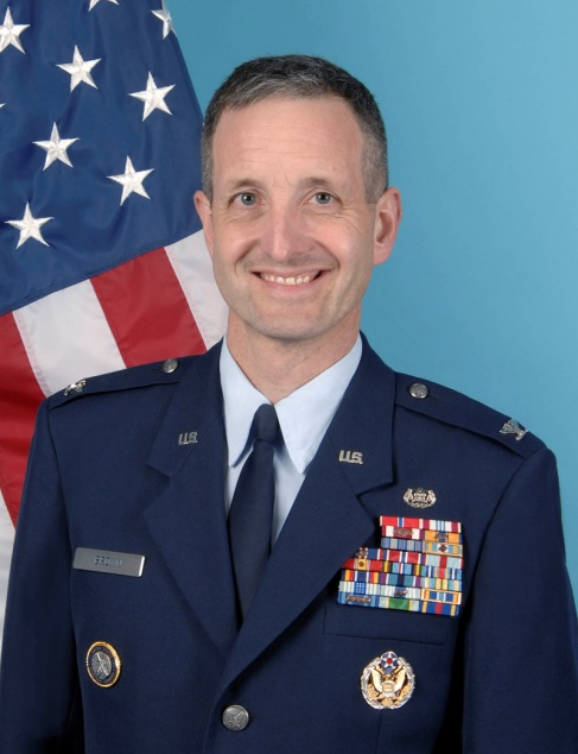
- Official portrait of Colonel Gary D. Brown, 2009.
- Occupations: Lawyer, USAF officer
- Known for: Cyber operations scholarship and blowing the whistle on government waste at Guantanamo
- Notable work: State Cyberspace Operations: Proposing a Cyber Response Framework

Colonel Gary D. Brown is an American lawyer and former officer in the United States Air Force. He was the official U.S. observer to the drafting of the Tallinn Manual on the International Law Applicable to Cyber Warfare (2013) and is a member of the International Group of Experts that authored Tallinn Manual 2.0 (2017). Professor Brown also appeared as the legal expert in the documentary film Zero Days (2016). He currently leads the cyber policy concentration at the Bush School of Government and Public Service at Texas A&M University.

== Academic career ==
Academic career
Year	Degree	Institution
1984	B.Sc.	University of Central Missouri, Warrensburg, Missouri
1987	J.D.	University of Nebraska College of Law, Lincoln, Nebraska
1988	LL.M.	Cambridge University, England
1994		Squadron Officer School, Maxwell Air Force Base, Alabama
2000		Air Command and Staff College, Maxwell Air Force Base, Alabama
2005		Air War College, Maxwell Air Force Base, Alabama

== Publications ==
Publications
Year	Title	Published in
2017	Out of the Loop	Temple International & Comparative Law Journal
2019	Commentary on the Law of Cyber Operations and the DoD Law of War Manual	Chapter in The United States Department of Defense Law of War Manual
2020	State Cyberspace Operations: Proposing a Cyber Response Framework	RUSI Occasional Paper
2020	International Law and Cyber Conflict	Chapter in Routledge Handbook of International Cybersecurity First Edition
2021	If You Think AI Won't Eclipse Humanity, You're Probably Just a Human	William and Mary Bill of Rights Journal

== Guantanamo military commission ==
In 2017 Brown was appointed the legal advisor to a Guantanamo military commission's newly appointed Convening authority, Harvey Rishikof.

Rishikof and Brown's appointments were terminated in early 2018. Observers commented that their termination suggested a disagreement between the pair and their superiors at the Pentagon.

In July 2020 Brown told National Public Radio that he and Rishikof had been negotiating plea agreements with the lawyers of the men facing charges. They'd take the death penalty off the table, if the suspects agreed to plead guilty and accept a sentence of life imprisonment.

== Whistleblower ==
In 2019 Brown formally filed a whistleblower report alleging substantial government waste, at Guantanamo. According to Brown, operating costs at Guantanamo had been $6 billion.
