= The CIA Insider's Guide to the Iran Crisis =

2020 book by John Kiriakou

- Front cover page of the book.
- Author: John Kiriakou and Gareth Porter
- Language: English
- Publisher: Simon & Schuster
- Publication date: February 4, 2020
- Publication place: United States
- Pages: 144
- ISBN: 978-1510756090

The CIA Insider's Guide to the Iran Crisis: From CIA Coup to the Brink of War is a non-fiction book by former US Central Intelligence Agency (CIA) Officer John Kiriakou and investigative journalist and historian Gareth Porter about America's behavior and actions during four decades with Iran. The book was published by Simon & Schuster publishing on February 4, 2020.

== Authors ==
=== John Kiriakou ===
John Kiriakou was previously an Intelligence analysis and case officer for the Central Intelligence Agency (CIA), a senior investigator for the Senate Foreign Relations Committee, counterterrorism, and a consultant to ABC News. In December 2007, he was the first U.S. government official to approve that waterboarding had been used to interrogate al-Qaeda prisoners, which he characterized as torture.

On 2012, Kiriakou became the first CIA officer to be convicted of passing classified information to a reporter that revealed the identity of a CIA officer. He was sentenced to 30 months for this disclosure.

=== Gareth Porter ===
Gareth Porter was born on June 18, 1942. He is an American historian, investigative journalist, author, and policy analyst specializing in U.S. national security issues. He wrote many books and researched Iran, Syria, Vietnam, and Cambodia.

On 2012, Porter was awarded the annual Martha Gellhorn Prize for Journalism at the Frontline Club in London to acknowledge reporting exposing official propaganda for articles about U.S. policies in Afghanistan and Pakistan. He has also been awarded a Serena Shim Award for Uncompromised Integrity in Journalism.

== Content ==
The book details how and why the United States and Iran have been either at war or threatening such a war for most of the forty years since the Islamic Republic of Iran was founded.

Information about how the United States began its encounter with Iran by obviously siding with British imperialism against Iran's demands for control over its oil in its 1953 overthrow of the Mohammad Mosaddegh government. In August 2013, the United States government officially confessed the United States' role in the coup by releasing a large portion of previously classified government documents that showed it was responsible for both planning and executing the coup, including bribing Iranian politicians, security, and high-ranking military officials, as well as pro-coup propaganda. Citing the CIA, it acknowledges that the coup was carried out "under the direction of the CIA" and "as an act of US foreign policy, designed and approved at the highest levels of government."

Then it describes how America actively supported the terrible chemical warfare of Saddam Hussein's regime against Iran.

== Translation ==
The book is translated into Persian and published in Iran. Both translation and publication is done by Nasleroshan publication.

== See also ==
- Fear: Trump in the White House
- Manufactured Crisis: The Untold Story of the Iran Nuclear Scare
- CIA activities in Iran
