= Erik van Sabben =

Dutch engineer (1972–2009)

Erik Jacob van Sabben (Vlissingen, The Netherlands January 31, 1972—January 16, 2009) was a Dutch engineer. He was allegedly recruited in 2008 by the Dutch intelligence services AIVD (General Intelligence and Security Service) and MIVD (Military Intelligence and Security Service) to infect the enrichment centrifuge infrastructure at the Natanz Nuclear Facility in Iran with the Stuxnet malware in 2009. This industrial espionage operation required years of preparation and cooperation between the CIA and Mossad, and cost $1 billion in a collaborative effort known as Operation Olympic Games. Stuxnet reportedly ruined almost one-fifth of Iran's nuclear centrifuges.

Van Sabben died two weeks after the Stuxnet attack at age 36 in an apparent single-vehicle motorcycle accident in Dubai. He was survived by his Iranian wife, Alenoosh, and two children from his first marriage, Yanna and Max van Sabben.

== See also ==
- 2021 Natanz incident
- Nuclear program of Iran
