= Zero Days =

2016 documentary film on stuxnet virus

- Theatrical release poster
- Directed by: Alex Gibney
- Written by: Alex Gibney
- Produced by: Marc Shmuger; Alex Gibney
- Cinematography: Antonio Rossi; Brett Wiley
- Edited by: Andy Grieve; Hannah Vanderlan (co-editor)
- Music by: Will Bates
- Production companies: Magnolia Pictures; Participant Media; Showtime Documentary Films; Global Produce; Jigsaw Productions
- Distributed by: Magnolia Pictures
- Release dates: February 11, 2016 (Berlin); July 8, 2016 (US)
- Running time: 116 minutes
- Country: United States
- Language: English

Zero Days is a 2016 American documentary film directed by Alex Gibney. It was selected to compete for the Golden Bear at the 66th Berlin International Film Festival.

== Synopsis ==
Although the entire subject is still shrouded in secrecy, the film attempts to tell the story of the development, deployment, discovery, and investigation of the Stuxnet computer virus and the malware software known as "Olympic Games" in as much detail, and as accurately, as possible. It concludes with a discussion of the follow-up cyber plan "Nitro Zeus", and the 2015 Iran Nuclear Deal.

== Interviewees ==
- David E. Sanger
- Emad Kiyaei, Director of External Affairs at the American Iranian Council (AIC)
- Eric Chien, Symantec security response
- Liam O'Murchu, Symantec security response
- Colonel Gary D. Brown, staff judge advocate of the United States Cyber Command
- Gary Samore
- Chris Inglis
- Amos Yadlin
- Yossi Melman
- Yuval Steinitz
- Eugene Kaspersky
- Vitaly Kamluk, Kaspersky Lab
- Michael Hayden
- Olli Heinonen
- Ralph Langner, control systems security consultant
- Richard A. Clarke
- Rolf Mowatt-Larssen, CIA Officer (1982–2005)
- Seán Paul McGurk, Department of Homeland Security Director of Cybersecurity (2008–2011)
- Sergey Ulasen, Kaspersky Lab Belarus

== Release ==
Zero Days was released digitally on Amazon Prime Video and iTunes on December 6, 2016, broadcast in the UK on BBC Four in the Storyville strand on January 16, 2017, and released on DVD on January 17, 2017.

== Reception ==
=== Critical response ===
On the review aggregator website Rotten Tomatoes, 90% of 73 critics' reviews of the film are positive, with an average rating of 7.3/10; the site's "critics consensus" reads: "Factors beyond Gibney's control prevent Zero Days from offering a comprehensive look at its subject, but the partial picture that emerges remains as frightening as it is impossible to ignore." On Metacritic, the film has a weighted average score of 77 out of 100 based on reviews from 23 critics, indicating "generally favorable" reviews.

Writing for RogerEbert.com, Godfrey Cheshire praised the film as "Easily the most important film anyone has released this year, it is a documentary that deserves to be seen by every sentient citizen of this country—and indeed the world."

=== Accolades ===
Zero Days was among the 15 films shortlisted for Best Documentary Feature at the 89th Academy Awards, but it was not chosen as one of the final five nominees in the category. It was nominated for Best Documentary Screenplay at the 69th Writers Guild of America Awards. The film won a Peabody Award in 2017.

== See also ==
- Not for the Faint of Heart: Lessons in Courage, Power and Persistence
- The Pragmatic Entente: Israeli-Iranian Relations, 1948-1988
