= Vba32 AntiVirus =

Antivirus software

Vba32
- Type: Antivirus software
- License: Proprietary
- Website: web.archive.org/web/20220602112310/https://anti-virus.by/en/index.shtml

VBA32 (Virus Block Ada 32) is antivirus software from the vendor VirusBlokAda for personal computers running Microsoft Windows. It detects and neutralizes computer viruses, computer worms, Trojan horses and other malware (backdoors, adware, spyware, etc.) in real time and on demand.

VBA32 is used as one of the antivirus engines at VirusTotal.

== VirusBlokAda ==
VirusBlokAda is an antivirus software vendor established in 1997 in Belarus. In 2010 it discovered Stuxnet, the first malware that attacks supervisory control and data acquisition (SCADA) systems.

== The program ==
In 2009 Judit Papp assessed that its VBA32 Antivirus product could detect 26 percent of unknown malware, compared to 67 percent detected by Avira's Antivir Premium and 8 percent detected by MicroWorlds' eScan Anti-Virus.

== See also ==
- Antivirus software
