= Operation Olympic Games =

Israeli-American collaboration sabotage campaign

Operation Olympic Games was an unacknowledged campaign of sabotage by means of cyber disruption, directed at Iranian nuclear facilities by the United States and Israel. As reported, it is one of the first known uses of offensive cyber weapons. Started under the administration of George W. Bush in 2006, Olympic Games was accelerated under President Obama, who heeded Bush's advice to continue cyber attacks on the Iranian nuclear facility at Natanz. Bush believed that the strategy was the only way to prevent an Israeli conventional strike on Iranian nuclear facilities. The operation produced a sophisticated computer virus known as Stuxnet, which was designed to disrupt Iran's uranium enrichment efforts.

== History ==
During president Bush's second term, General James Cartwright, then head of United States Strategic Command, along with other intelligence officials presented Bush with sophisticated code that would act as an offensive cyber weapon. "The goal was to gain access to the Natanz plant's industrial computer controls ... the computer code would invade the specialized computers that command the centrifuges." Collaboration happened with Israel's SIGINT intelligence service, Unit 8200. Israel's involvement was important to the United States because the former had "deep intelligence about operations at Natanz that would be vital to making the cyber attack a success." Additionally, American officials hoped to "dissuade the Israelis from carrying out their own pre-emptive strike against Iranian nuclear facilities". To prevent a conventional strike, Israel had to be deeply involved in Operation Olympic Games.

The resulting program, code-named Olympic Games, produced a computer virus developed by the two countries—referred to as "the bug" internally and later identified publicly as Stuxnet by the IT community. The malicious software temporarily halted approximately 1,000 of the 5,000 centrifuges from spinning at Natanz. A programming error later caused the worm to spread to computers outside of Natanz. When an engineer "left Natanz and connected [his] computer to the Internet, the American- and Israeli-made bug failed to recognize that its environment had changed." The code replicated on the Internet and was subsequently exposed for public dissemination. IT security firms Symantec and Kaspersky Lab have since examined Stuxnet. It is unclear whether the United States or Israel introduced the programming error.

Early in his presidency, Barack Obama expanded the cyberoperation, authorizing its continuation even after the accidental spread beyond Iran in 2010. He judged the program still effective and allowed the attacks to proceed.

Dutch engineer Erik van Sabben allegedly infiltrated the Natanz nuclear facility on behalf of Dutch intelligence and installed equipment infected with Stuxnet. He died two weeks after the Stuxnet attack at age 36 in an apparent single-vehicle motorcycle accident in Dubai.

== Significance ==
According to The Atlantic, Operation Olympic Games is "probably the most significant covert manipulation of the electromagnetic spectrum since World War II, when cryptanalysts broke the Enigma cipher that allowed access to Nazi codes." The New Yorker claims Operation Olympic Games is "the first formal offensive act of pure cyber sabotage by the United States against another country, if you do not count electronic penetrations that have preceded conventional military attacks, such as that of Iraq's military computers before the 2003 invasion of Iraq." Therefore, "American and Israeli official action can stand as justification for others."

The Washington Post reported that Flame malware was also part of Olympic Games.

== Leak investigation ==
In June 2013, it was reported that Cartwright was the target of a year-long investigation by the US Department of Justice into the leak of classified information about the operation to the US media. In March 2015, it was reported that the investigation had stalled amid concerns that necessary evidence for prosecution was too sensitive to reveal in court.

Referring to unnamed sources within the CIA and NSA, the documentary film Zero Days claims that the Stuxnet/Olympic Games malware was just a small part of a much larger mission to infiltrate and compromise Iran—"Nitro Zeus" (NZ).

== See also ==
- Operation Merlin
