= The Journal of Environment & Development =

- Discipline: Environmental studies, environmental economics
- Language: English
- Edited by: Raymond Clémençon

Publication details
- History: 1992–present
- Publisher: SAGE Publications
- Frequency: Quarterly
- Impact factor: 2.313 (2017)

Standard abbreviations
- ISO 4: J. Environ. Dev.

Indexing
- ISSN: 1070-4965 (print); 1552-5465 (web)
- LCCN: 93657037
- OCLC no.: 26268045

Links
- Journal homepage; Online access; Online archive

The Journal of Environment & Development is a quarterly peer-reviewed academic journal that covers research in the fields of environmental studies and international policy. The journal's editor-in-chief is Raymond Clémençon (Bren School of Environmental Science & Management). It was established in 1992 and is currently published by SAGE Publications.

== Abstracting and indexing ==
The Journal of Environment & Development is abstracted and indexed in:

- Aquatic Sciences and Fisheries Abstracts
- CAB Abstracts Database
- Current Contents/Social & Behavioral Sciences
- EconLit
- EMBiology
- Expanded Academic Index
- GEOBASE
- International Bibliography of the Social Sciences
- International Bibliography of Periodical Literature on the Humanities and Social Sciences
- LexisNexis
- Scopus
- Social Sciences Citation Index
- Sociological Abstracts

According to the Journal Citation Reports, the journal has a 2014 impact factor of 2.313, ranking it 17th out of 57 journals in the category "Planning & Development" and 42nd out of 108 journals in the category "Environmental Studies".
