= WinCC =

Industrial automation and control software

- Developer: Siemens
- Initial release: 1996
- Stable release: V8.0 / March 2023
- Operating system: Microsoft Windows
- Type: SCADA
- Website: siemens.com

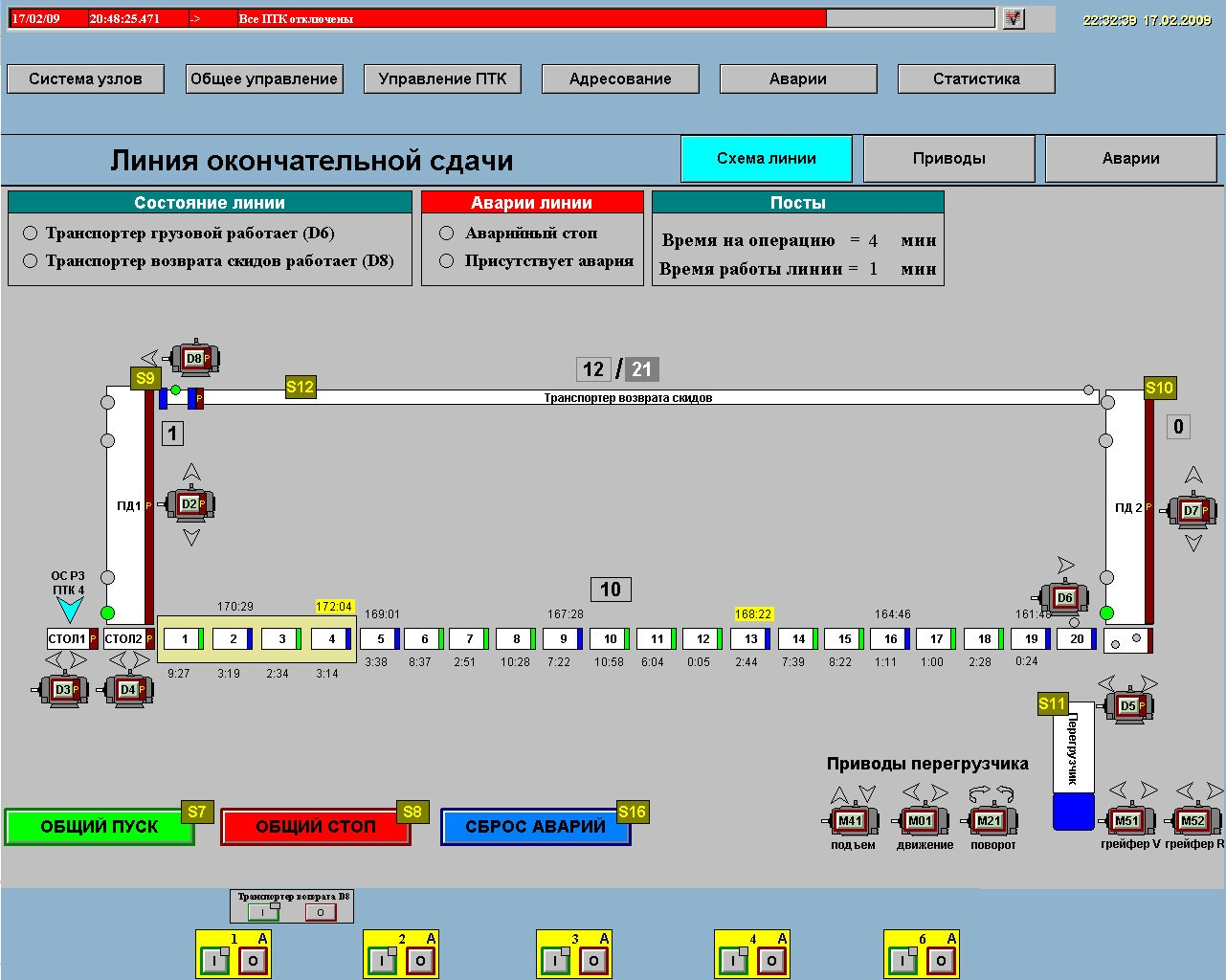
Screenshot of WinCC interface.

SIMATIC WinCC is a supervisory control and data acquisition (SCADA) and human-machine interface (HMI) system from Siemens. SCADA systems are used to monitor and control physical processes involved in industry and infrastructure on a large scale and over long distances. SIMATIC WinCC can be used in combination with Siemens controllers. WinCC is written for the Microsoft Windows operating system. It uses Microsoft SQL Server for logging and comes with a VBScript and ANSI C application programming interface.

In 2010, WinCC and PCS 7 were the first known SCADA systems to be specifically targeted by malware. The Stuxnet worm can spy on and even reprogram infected systems.
