= Science Council of Japan =

Representative organisation for the Japanese scientific community

- 日本学術会議

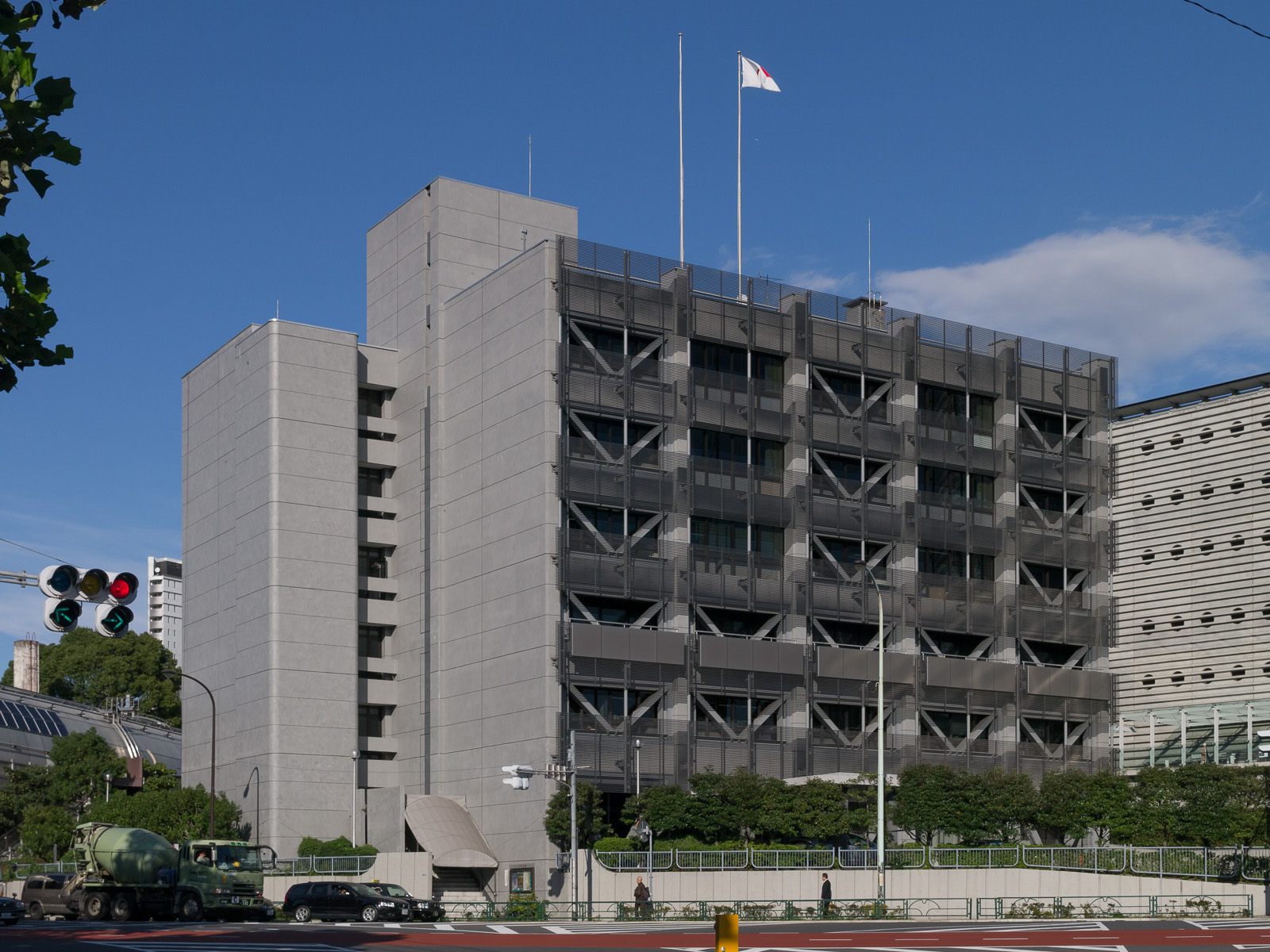
- SCJ headquarters in Minato, Tokyo
- Abbreviation: SCJ
- Predecessor: Japan Association of Science Liaison; Preparatory Committee (Sewaninkai)
- Formation: 20 January 1949
- Founder: Harry C. Kelly
- Headquarters: Roppongi, Minato-ku, Tokyo
- Members: 210 (2015)
- President: Takashi Onishi
- Vice-President (Organizational Management): Chiaki Mukai
- Vice-President (Contacts with Government): Kumie Inose
- Vice-President (International Activities): Keisuke Hanaki
- Key people: Kôdi Husimi; Akira Fujiwara; Toshiyuki Kobayashi
- Affiliations: Association of Asian Social Science Research Councils (AASSREC)
- Website: www.scj.go.jp

The Science Council of Japan (SCJ) is a representative organization of Japanese scholars and scientists in all fields of sciences, including humanities, social sciences, life sciences, natural sciences, and engineering. Takashi Onishi, president of Toyohashi Tech, is the elected president as of 2016, having been elected for two consecutive terms starting in 2013. The SCJ is headquartered in Roppongi, a district of Minato, Tokyo. Members of the SCJ are elected by scientists of all levels, including research scholars. Elected members are confirmed by the Government of Japan, a method similar to that of the National Academy of Sciences in the United States, upon which the structure of the SCJ was based. It was officially founded in January 1949 to function as an independent scientific statutory body under the jurisdiction of the prime minister of Japan.

As of 2015, the SCJ consists of 210 elected members appointed by the prime minister and 2,000 associate members. Its organizational setup includes a General Assembly, an executive board, three Section Meetings (namely Humanities and Social Sciences, Life Sciences, and Physical Sciences and Engineering), 30 committees based on fields of specialties, five Administrative Committees for operation, and issue-oriented ad hoc committees.

== History ==
The Science Council of Japan was founded by Harry C. Kelly during the American occupation of Japan after World War II. A former professor of physics at Lehigh University, Kelly was working in the American occupation forces. He was appointed as the civilian chief of the Fundamental Research Branch, and was subsequently appointed its associate director. His first achievement was the creation of the Japan Association of Science Liaison, a private organisation. The organisation was developed into the Preparatory Committee (Sewaninkai) of the Scientific Research Organisation Renewal Committee. It was eventually renamed the Science Council of Japan and governmentally constituted in 1949 as a "special organisation". It was formally inaugurated on 20 January at its first general meeting.

In 2020, Prime Minister Yoshihide Suga rejected six candidates nominated for the council, drawing criticism from opposition lawmakers and academics.

== Activities ==
In June 2015, the Ministry of Education, Culture, Sports, Science and Technology of the Japanese government issued a directive to abolish or reduce humanities and social sciences in all national universities. The Science Council of Japan opposed the order. Representing the resolution of the council's executive board, President Onishi held a press conference on 23 July condemning the official decision. He expressed the council's belief that the dissolution of these disciplines "may result in higher education in Japan losing its breadth and depth."

The Science Council of Japan was a consultative and decision making body in Japan's high-level radioactive waste management policy. The Japanese government enacted the Designated Radioactive Waste Final Disposal Act in 2000, under which the Nuclear Waste Management Organization of Japan (NUMO) was established. The operations and reports of NUMO were submitted to the council for inspection and evaluation in 2011. The council offered its suggestions for action to the government in 2012.
