= Japanese nuclear weapons programs =

Failed attempt by the Empire of Japan to develop nuclear technology

Empire of Japan
- Nuclear program start date: 1940
- Nuclear program end date: 21 July 1945
- Total tests: 0
- Peak stockpile: 0

During World War II, the Empire of Japan had several programs exploring the use of nuclear fission for military technology, including nuclear reactors and nuclear weapons. Like the similar wartime programs in Nazi Germany, they were comparatively small, suffered from Allied air raids, shortages, disarray, and did not progress beyond the laboratory stage.

The Imperial Japanese Army initiated the "Ni-Go Project" for nuclear weapons at the RIKEN institute, led by physicist Yoshio Nishina. Work was limited to cyclotron research, production of small quantities of uranium hexafluoride, and an unsuccessful attempt to enrich it via thermal diffusion in a Clusius tube.

The Imperial Japanese Navy also supported the "F-Go Project", at Kyoto Imperial University, led by physicist Bunsaku Arakatsu and involving Hideki Yukawa. This group focused on designing an ultracentrifuge to enrich uranium hexafluoride, but did not construct any before the end of the war.

Japan has not since had a nuclear weapons program. Its postwar constitution is interpreted to forbid its possession of weapons of mass destruction. It is party to the Nuclear Non-Proliferation Treaty, and has enacted laws affirming its Three Non-Nuclear Principles: to not possess, manufacture, or permit the introduction of nuclear weapons. However, the United States stationed nuclear weapons in Japan and in the Ryukyu Islands from the 1950s until 1972.

Today, Japan is considered to be a latent or threshold nuclear state, capable of developing weapons in a short timespan. It is unique among non-nuclear weapons states in that it possesses a full nuclear fuel cycle and plutonium stockpile, as part of its civilian nuclear energy industry, and advanced developments in the industries necessary to make nuclear weapons.

== Background ==
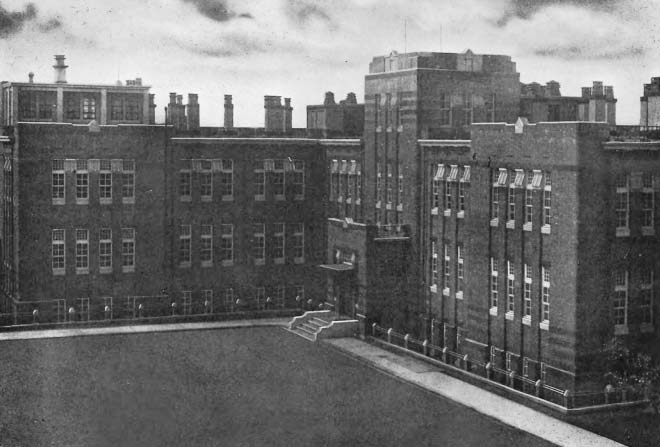
The Institute of Physical and Chemical Research building in Taisho period

In 1934, Tohoku University professor Hikosaka Tadayoshi's "atomic physics theory" was released. Hikosaka pointed out the huge energy contained by nuclei and the possibility that both nuclear power generation and weapons could be created. In December 1938, the German chemists Otto Hahn and Fritz Strassmann sent a manuscript to Naturwissenschaften reporting that they had detected the element barium after bombarding uranium with neutrons; simultaneously, they communicated these results to Lise Meitner. Meitner, and her nephew Otto Robert Frisch, correctly interpreted these results as being nuclear fission and Frisch confirmed this experimentally on 13 January 1939. Physicists around the world immediately realized that chain reactions could be produced and notified their governments of the possibility of developing nuclear weapons.

== World War II ==
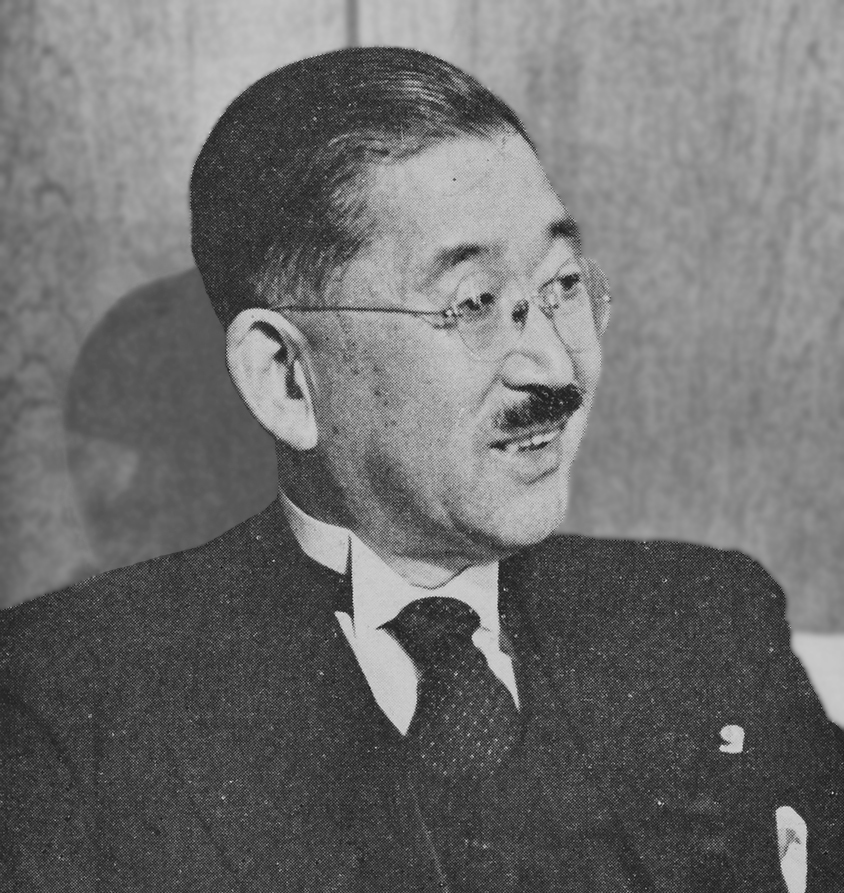
The third director of the RIKEN Institute Masatoshi Okochi submitted a report on "Possibility of Uranium Bomb Manufacturing" in May 1941.

The leading figure in the Japanese atomic program was Yoshio Nishina, a close associate of Niels Bohr. Nishina had co-authored the Klein–Nishina formula. Nishina had established his own Nuclear Research Laboratory to study high-energy physics in 1931 at RIKEN Institute (the Institute for Physical and Chemical Research), which had been established in 1917 in Tokyo to promote basic research. Nishina had built his first 26-inch (660 mm) cyclotron in 1936, and another 60-inch (1,500 mm), 220-ton cyclotron in 1937. In 1938 Japan also purchased a cyclotron from the University of California, Berkeley.

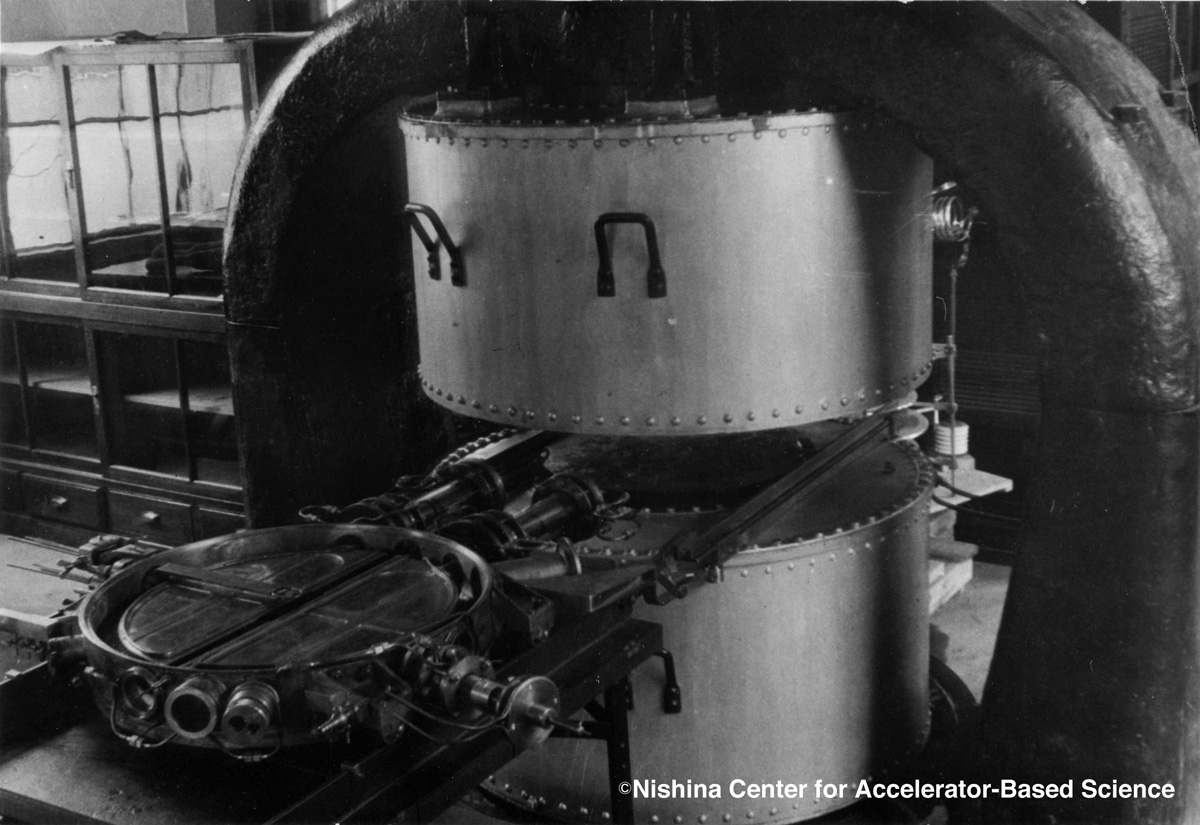
Yoshio Nishina completed this "small" cyclotron in 1937, the first cyclotron constructed in Japan, and one of the few outside the United States.

Due to the German-Japanese alliance resulting from Germany's Four Year Plan, Japan and its military had already been pursuing nuclear science to catch up to the West in nuclear technology. This allowed for Nishina to introduce quantum mechanics to Japan.

In 1939, Nishina recognized the military potential of nuclear fission, and was worried that the Americans were working on a nuclear weapon which might be used against Japan.

In August 1939, Hungarian-born physicists Leo Szilard and Eugene Wigner drafted the Einstein–Szilard letter, which warned of the potential development of "extremely powerful bombs of a new type". The United States started the investigations into fission weapons in the United States, which eventually evolved into the massive Manhattan Project, and the laboratory from which Japan purchased a cyclotron became one of the major sites for weapons research.

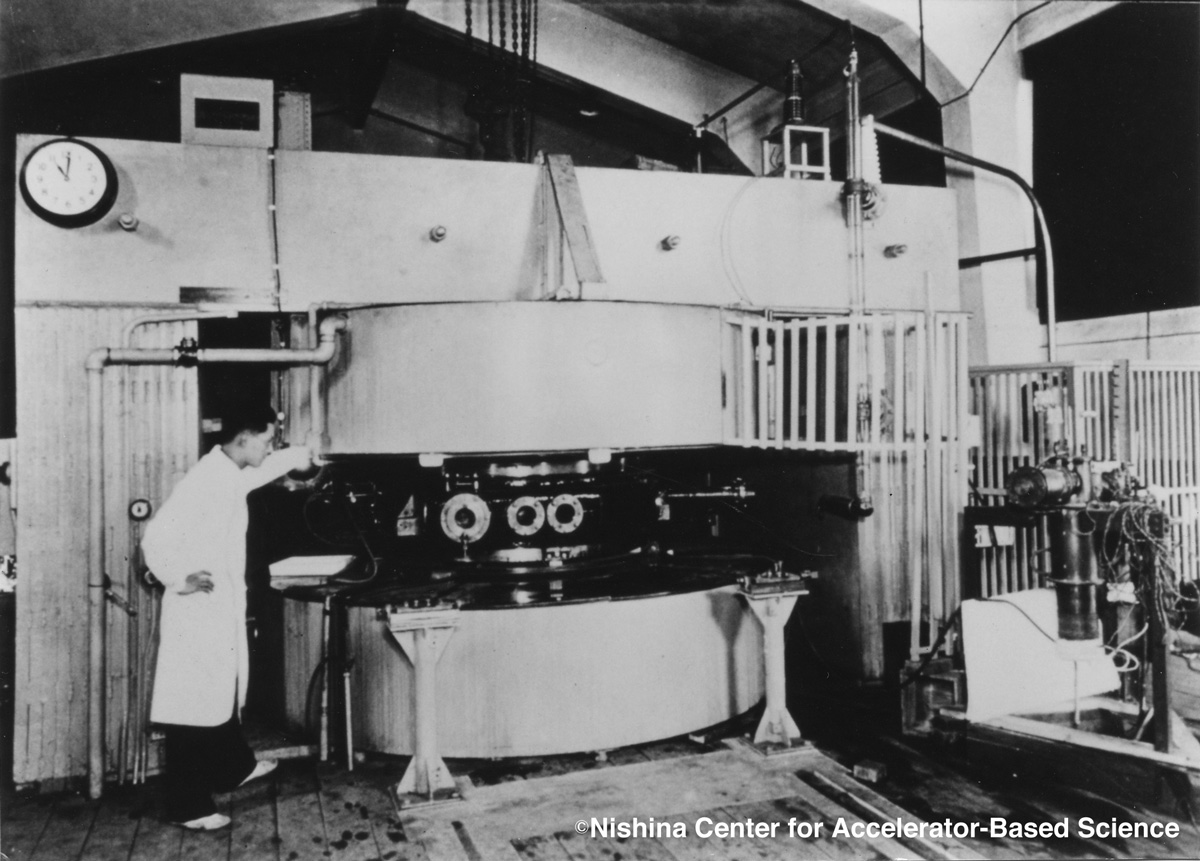
The second RIKEN cyclotron, completed in 1943

In the early summer of 1940, Nishina met Lieutenant-General Takeo Yasuda on a train. Yasuda was at the time director of the Army Aeronautical Department's Technical Research Institute. Nishina told Yasuda about the possibility of building nuclear weapons. However, the Japanese fission project did not formally begin until April 1941 when Yasuda acted on Army Minister Hideki Tōjō's order to investigate the possibilities of nuclear weapons. Yasuda passed the order down the chain of command to Viscount Masatoshi Ōkōchi, director of the RIKEN Institute, who in turn passed it to Nishina, whose Nuclear Research Laboratory by 1941 had over 100 researchers.

=== B-Research ===
Meanwhile, the Imperial Japanese Navy's Technology Research Institute had been pursuing its own separate investigations, and had engaged professors from the Imperial University, Tokyo, for advice on nuclear weapons. Before the Attack on Pearl Harbor in 1941, Captain Yoji Ito of the Naval Technical Research Institution of Japan initiated a study that would allow for the Japanese Navy to use nuclear fission. After consulting with Professor Sagane at Tokyo Imperial University, his research showed that nuclear fission would be a potential power source for the Navy.

This resulted in the formation of the Committee on Research in the Application of Nuclear Physics, chaired by Nishina, that met ten times between July 1942 and March 1943. After the Japanese Navy lost at Midway, Captain Ito proposed a new type of nuclear weapons development designated as "B-Research" (also called "Jin Project", Japanese: 仁計画, lit. "Nuclear Project") by the end of June 1942. By December, deep in the project, it became evident that while an atomic bomb was feasible in principle, "Japanese scientists believed that it would be difficult for even the United States to realize the application of atomic energy in time to influence the outcome of the war." This caused the Navy to lose interest and to concentrate instead on research into radar.

=== Ni-Go Project ===
In 1942 the Army was not discouraged, and soon after the Committee issued its report it set up an experimental project at RIKEN, the Ni-Go Project (lit. "The Second Project"). Its aim was to separate uranium-235 by thermal diffusion, ignoring alternative methods such as electromagnetic separation, gaseous diffusion, and centrifugal separation.

By spring 1944, the Nishina Project barely made any progress due to insufficient uranium hexafluoride for its Clusius tube. The previously provided uranium within the copper tube had corroded and the project was unable to separate U-235 isotopes.

By February 1945, a small group of scientists had succeeded in producing a small amount of material in a rudimentary separator in the RIKEN complex—material which RIKEN's cyclotron indicated was not uranium-235. The separator project came to an end in March 1945, when the building housing it was destroyed by a fire caused by the USAAF's Operation Meetinghouse raid on Tokyo. No attempt was made to build a uranium pile; heavy water was unavailable, but Takeuchi Masa, who was in charge of Nishina's separator, calculated that light water would suffice if the uranium could be enriched to 5–10% uranium-235.

While these experiments were in progress, the Army and Navy searched for uranium ore, in locations ranging from Fukushima Prefecture to Korea, China, and Burma. The Japanese also requested materials from their German allies and 560 kg (1,230 lb) of unprocessed uranium oxide was dispatched to Japan in April 1945 aboard the submarine U-234, which however surrendered to US forces in the Atlantic following Germany's surrender. The uranium oxide was reportedly labeled as "U-235", which may have been a mislabeling of the submarine's name and its exact characteristics remain unknown; some sources believe that it was not weapons-grade material and was intended for use as a catalyst in the production of synthetic methanol to be used for aviation fuel.

The attack also effectively destroyed the Clusius tube and any chances of the Japanese producing an atomic bomb in time to influence the war in their favor and rival the West in nuclear weaponry.

According to the historian Williams, "The same lack of sufficient high quality uranium that had impeded the German atomic project had also, as it turned out, obstructed Japanese attempts to make a bomb." This was the conclusion of the Manhattan Project Intelligence Group, who also reported Japan's nuclear physicists were just as good as those from other nations.

=== F-Go Project ===
In 1943, a different Japanese naval command began a nuclear research program, the F-Go Project (lit. "The F Project"), under Bunsaku Arakatsu at the Imperial University, Kyoto. Arakatsu had spent some years studying abroad including at the Cavendish Laboratory at Cambridge under Ernest Rutherford and at Berlin University under Albert Einstein. Next to Nishina, Arakatsu was the most notable nuclear physicist in Japan. His team included Hideki Yukawa, who would become in 1949 the first Japanese physicist to receive a Nobel Prize.

Early on in the war Commander Kitagawa, head of the Navy Research Institute's Chemical Section, had requested Arakatsu to carry out work on the separation of Uranium-235. The work went slowly, but shortly before the end of the war he had designed an ultracentrifuge (to spin at 60,000 rpm) which he was hopeful would achieve the required results. Only the design of the machinery was completed before the Japanese surrender.

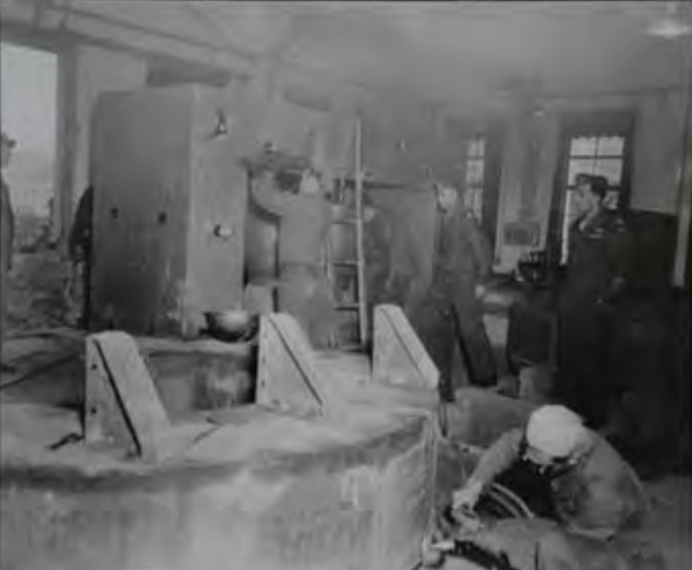
Bunsaku Arakatsu's accelerator demolition by GHQ, 24 November 1945.

After Arakatsu and Nishina's meeting, in spring 1944, the Army-Navy Technology Enforcement Committee formed due to lack of progress in the development of Japanese nuclear weapons. This led to the only meeting of the leaders of the F-Go Project scientists, on 21 July 1945. After the meeting, nuclear weaponry research ended as a result of the destruction of the facility that housed isotope separation research, known as Building 49.

Shortly after the surrender of Japan, the Manhattan Project's Atomic Bomb Mission, which had deployed to Japan in September, reported that the F-Go Project had obtained 20 grams a month of heavy water from electrolytic ammonia plants in Korea and Kyushu. In fact, the industrialist Jun Noguchi had launched a heavy water production program some years previously. In 1926, Noguchi founded the Korean Hydro Electric Company at Konan (now known as Hungnam) in north-eastern Korea: this became the site of an industrial complex producing ammonia for fertilizer production. However, despite the availability of a heavy-water production facility whose output could potentially have rivalled that of Norsk Hydro at Vemork in Norway, it appears that the Japanese did not carry out neutron-multiplication studies using heavy water as a moderator at Kyoto.

=== Postwar aftermath ===
On 16 October 1945, Nishina sought permission from the American occupation forces to use the two cyclotrons at the Riken Institute for biological and medical research, which was soon granted; however, on 10 November instructions were received from the US Secretary of War in Washington to destroy the cyclotrons at the Riken, Kyoto University, and Osaka University. This was done on 24 November; the Riken's cyclotrons were taken apart and thrown into Tokyo Bay.

In a letter of protest against this destruction Nishina wrote that the cyclotrons at the Riken had had nothing to do with the production of nuclear weapons, however the large cyclotron had officially been a part of the Ni-Go Project. Nishina had placed it within the Project by suggesting that the cyclotron could serve basic research for the use of nuclear power, simply so that he could continue working on the device; the military nature of the Project gave him access to funding and kept his researchers from being drafted into the armed forces. He felt no qualms about this because he saw no possibility of producing nuclear weapons in Japan before the end of the war.

=== Reports of a Japanese weapon test ===
On 2 October 1946, the Atlanta Constitution published a story by reporter David Snell, who had been an investigator with the 24th Criminal Investigation Detachment in Korea after the war, which alleged that the Japanese had successfully tested a nuclear weapon near Hungnam (Konan) before the town was captured by the Soviets. He said that he had received his information at Seoul in September 1945 from a Japanese officer to whom he gave the pseudonym of Captain Wakabayashi, who had been in charge of counter-intelligence at Hungnam. SCAP officials, who were responsible for strict censorship of all information about Japan's wartime interest in nuclear physics, were dismissive of Snell's report.

Under the 1947–1948 investigation, comments were sought from Japanese scientists who would or should have known about such a project. Further doubt is cast on Snell's story by the lack of evidence of large numbers of Japanese scientists leaving Japan for Korea and never returning. Snell's statements were repeated by Robert K. Wilcox in his 1985 book Japan's Secret War: Japan's Race Against Time to Build Its Own Atomic Bomb. The book also included what Wilcox stated was new evidence from intelligence material which indicated the Japanese might have had an atomic program at Hungnam. These specific reports were dismissed in a review of the book by Department of Energy employee Roger M. Anders which was published in the journal Military Affairs, an article written by two historians of science in the journal Isis, and another article in the journal Intelligence and National Security.

== Postwar ==
Since the bombing of Hiroshima and Nagasaki, Japan has been a staunch upholder of antinuclear sentiments. Its postwar Constitution forbids the establishment of offensive military forces, and in 1967 it adopted the Three Non-Nuclear Principles, ruling out the production, possession, or introduction of nuclear weapons. Despite this, the idea that Japan might become a nuclear power has persisted. After China's first nuclear test in 1964, Japanese Prime Minister Eisaku Satō said to President Lyndon Johnson when they met in January 1965, that if the Chinese Communists had nuclear weapons, the Japanese should also have them. This shocked Johnson's administration, especially when Sato added that "Japanese public opinion will not permit this at present, but I believe that the public, especially the younger generation, can be 'educated'."

Throughout Sato's administration Japan continued to discuss the nuclear option. It was suggested that tactical nuclear weapons, as opposed to larger strategic weapons, could be defined as defensive, and therefore be allowed by the Japanese Constitution. A White Paper commissioned by future Prime Minister Yasuhiro Nakasone opined that it would be possible that possessing small-yield, purely defensive nuclear weapons would not violate the Constitution, but that in view of the danger of adverse foreign reaction and possible war, a policy would be followed of not acquiring nuclear weapons "at present".

=== Nuclear Non-Proliferation Treaty ===
The Johnson administration became anxious about Sato's intentions and made securing Japan's signature to the Nuclear Non-Proliferation Treaty (NPT) one of its top priorities. In December 1967, to reassure the Japanese public, Sato announced the adoption of the Three Non-Nuclear Principles. These were that Japan would not manufacture, possess, or permit nuclear weapons on Japanese soil. The principles, which were adopted by the Diet, but are not law, have remained the basis of Japan's nuclear policy ever since.

According to Kei Wakaizumi, one of Sato's policy advisers, Sato realized soon after making the declaration that it might be too constraining. He therefore clarified the principles in a February 1968 address to the Diet by declaring the "Four Nuclear Policies" ("Four-Pillars Nuclear Policy"):

- Promotion of the peaceful use of nuclear energy
- Efforts towards global nuclear disarmament
- Reliance and dependence on US extended deterrence, based on the 1960 US-Japan Security Treaty
- Support for the "Three Non-Nuclear Principles under the circumstances where Japan's national security is guaranteed by the other three policies."

It followed that if American assurance was ever removed or seemed unreliable, Japan might have no choice but to go nuclear. In other words, it kept the nuclear option available.

In 1969, a policy planning study for Japan's Foreign Ministry concluded that Japan should, even if it signed the NPT, maintain the economic and technical ability to develop and produce nuclear weapons in case it should ever become necessary, for example due to the international situation.

Japan finally signed the NPT in 1970 and ratified it in 1976, but only after West Germany became a signatory and the US promised "not to interfere with Tokyo's pursuit of independent reprocessing capabilities in its civilian nuclear power program".

=== Extension of Nuclear Non-Proliferation Treaty ===
In 1995, the Clinton administration pushed the Japanese government to endorse the indefinite extension of the NPT, but it opted for an ambiguous position on the issue. A former Japanese government official recalled, "We thought it was better for us not to declare that we will give up our nuclear option forever and ever". However, eventually pressure from Washington and other nations led to Japan's supporting the indefinite extension.

In 1998, two events strengthened the hand of those in Japan advocating that the nation should at least reconsider if not reverse its non-nuclear policy. Advocates of such policies included conservative academics, some government officials, a few industrialists, and nationalist groups.

The first of these events was India and Pakistan both conducting nuclear tests; the Japanese were troubled by a perceived reluctance on the part of the international community to condemn the two countries' actions, since one of the reasons Japan had opted to join the NPT was that it had anticipated severe penalties for those states who defied the international consensus against further nuclear proliferation. Also, Japan and other nations feared that an Indian nuclear arsenal could cause a localized nuclear arms race with China.

The second event was the August 1998 launch of a North Korean Taepodong-1 missile over Japan which caused a public outcry and led some to call for remilitarization or the development of nuclear weapons. Fukushiro Nukaga, head of the Japan Defense Agency, said that his government would be justified in mounting pre-emptive strikes against North Korean missile bases. Prime Minister Keizō Obuchi reiterated Japan's non-nuclear weapon principles and said that Japan would not possess a nuclear arsenal, and that the matter was not even worthy of discussion.

However, it is thought that Prime Minister Junichiro Koizumi implied he agreed that Japan had the right to possess nuclear weapons when he added, "it is significant that although we could have them, we don't".

Earlier, Shinzō Abe had said that Japan's constitution did not necessarily ban possession of nuclear weapons, so long as they were kept at a minimum and were tactical weapons, and Chief Cabinet Secretary Yasuo Fukuda had expressed a similar view.

=== De facto nuclear state ===
While there are currently no known plans in Japan to produce nuclear weapons, it has been argued Japan has the technology, raw materials, and the capital to produce nuclear weapons within one year if necessary, and many analysts consider it a de facto nuclear state for this reason. For this reason Japan is often said to be a "screwdriver's turn" away from possessing nuclear weapons, or to possess a "bomb in the basement".

The United States stored extensive nuclear assets in Okinawa prefecture when it was under American administration until the 1970s. There were approximately 1,200 nuclear warheads in Okinawa.

Significant amounts of reactor-grade plutonium are created as a by-product of the nuclear energy industry. During the 1970s, the Japanese government made several appeals to the United States to use reprocessed plutonium in forming a "plutonium economy" for peaceful commercial use. This began a significant debate within the Carter administration about the risk of proliferation associated with reprocessing while also acknowledging Japan's need for energy and right to the use of peaceful nuclear technology. Ultimately, an agreement was reached that allowed Japan to repurpose the byproducts of nuclear power-related activities; however their efforts regarding fast-breeding plutonium reactors were largely unsuccessful.

In 2012, Japan was reported to have 9 tonnes of plutonium stored in Japan, which would be enough for more than 1,000 nuclear warheads, and an additional 35 tonnes stored in Europe. It has constructed the Rokkasho Reprocessing Plant, which could produce further plutonium. Japan has a considerable quantity of highly enriched uranium (HEU), supplied by the U.S. and UK, for use in its research reactors and fast neutron reactor research programs; approximately 1,200 to 1,400 kg of HEU as of 2014. Japan also possesses an indigenous uranium enrichment plant which could hypothetically be used to make highly enriched uranium suitable for weapons use.

Japan has also developed the M-V three-stage solid-fuel rocket, somewhat similar in design to the U.S. LGM-118A Peacekeeper ICBM, giving it a missile technology base. It now has an easier-to-launch second generation solid-fuel rocket, Epsilon. Japan has experience in re-entry vehicle technology (OREX, HOPE-X). Toshiyuki Shikata, a Tokyo Metropolitan Government adviser and former lieutenant general, said that part of the rationale for the fifth M-V Hayabusa mission, from 2003 to 2010, was that the re-entry and landing of its return capsule demonstrated "that Japan's ballistic missile capability is credible." A Japanese nuclear deterrent would probably be sea-based with ballistic missile submarines. In 2011, former Minister of Defense Shigeru Ishiba explicitly backed the idea of Japan maintaining the capability of nuclear latency:

"I don't think Japan needs to possess nuclear weapons, but it's important to maintain our commercial reactors because it would allow us to produce a nuclear warhead in a short amount of time ... It's a tacit nuclear deterrent"

On 24 March 2014, Japan agreed to turn over more than 700 pounds (320 kg) of weapons grade plutonium and highly enriched uranium to the US, which started to be returned in 2016. It has been pointed out that as long as Japan enjoys the benefits of a "nuclear-ready" status held through surrounding countries, it will see no reason to actually produce nuclear arms, since by remaining below the threshold, although with the capability to cross it at short notice, Japan can expect the support of the US while posing as an equal to China and Russia.

Former Mayor and Governor of Osaka Tōru Hashimoto in 2008 argued on several television programs that Japan should possess nuclear weapons, but has since said that this was his private opinion.

Former Governor of Tokyo 1999-2012, Shintaro Ishihara was an advocate of Japan having nuclear weapons.

On 29 March 2016, then-U.S. presidential candidate Donald Trump suggested that Japan should develop its own nuclear weapons, claiming that it was becoming too expensive for the US to continue to protect Japan from countries such as China, North Korea, and Russia that already have their own nuclear weapons.

On 27 February 2022, former prime minister Shinzo Abe proposed that Japan should consider a nuclear sharing arrangement with the US similar to NATO. This includes housing American nuclear weapons on Japanese soil for deterrence. This plan comes in the wake of the 2022 Russian invasion of Ukraine. Many Japanese politicians consider Vladimir Putin's threat to use nuclear weapons against a non-nuclear state to be a game changer.

Although an indigenous nuclear program in Japan is unlikely to develop due to low public support, the existential Chinese and North Korean threats have raised security concerns domestically. The role of public opinion is central, and studies show that threat perceptions—mainly of China’s growing military abilities—have strengthened Japanese public support for a nuclear program. Japan has long held negative views on nuclear weapons, and previously, even discussions of nuclear armament or deterrence in the country was unpopular due to a strong "nuclear taboo". However, this taboo has been breaking, especially because Abe elevated the topic to mainstream politics during his tenure.

National identity is an important factor in Japanese nuclear armament. Since World War II, the peace constitution has greatly limited the ability of Japanese military advancement, restricting them from having an active military or waging war with another country. These restrictions and the strong desire of former colonies—especially Korea and China—for apology and reconciliation by Japan for its crimes and atrocities committed under pre-WWII imperialism, coupled with Japan's refusal to make appropriate amends, led to the rise of a conservative branch of the ruling Liberal Democratic Party (LDP) in Japan that encouraged revisions to the Peace Constitution and promoted, under former prime minister Shinzo Abe, "healthy nationalism", which aimed to restore the Japanese public's sense of pride in the country. The revisionists sought to "create a new national identity" that increased national pride, allowed for collective self-defense and removed "institutional limitations on military activities".

Since the reliability of U.S. security guarantees shapes Japan's nuclear policy, a strong American nuclear umbrella is necessary to prevent Japan from developing nuclear weapons of its own. Since the 1960s, however, Japanese confidence in U.S. security guarantees has been influenced by American foreign policy shifts, from Nixon's "Guam Doctrine" to Trump's desire for allies to provide more of their own security. Although Japan developing nuclear weapons would violate the Non-Proliferation Treaty (NPT) and potentially decrease U.S. power in East Asia, there is historical precedent for the U.S. to be complacent regarding Japan building nuclear arms: as long as Japan is a democracy, a friend of Washington and has high state capacity, the U.S. alliance would likely be maintained. This was the case for France and the United Kingdom, when they developed their own nuclear weapons after the end of the Second World War despite American deterrence.

== See also ==
- History of nuclear weapons
- Japan and weapons of mass destruction
- Japan's non-nuclear weapons policy
- German nuclear weapons program
- Nuclear latency
