= Hsu Yun-chi =

Taiwanese nuclear physicist

- 許雲基
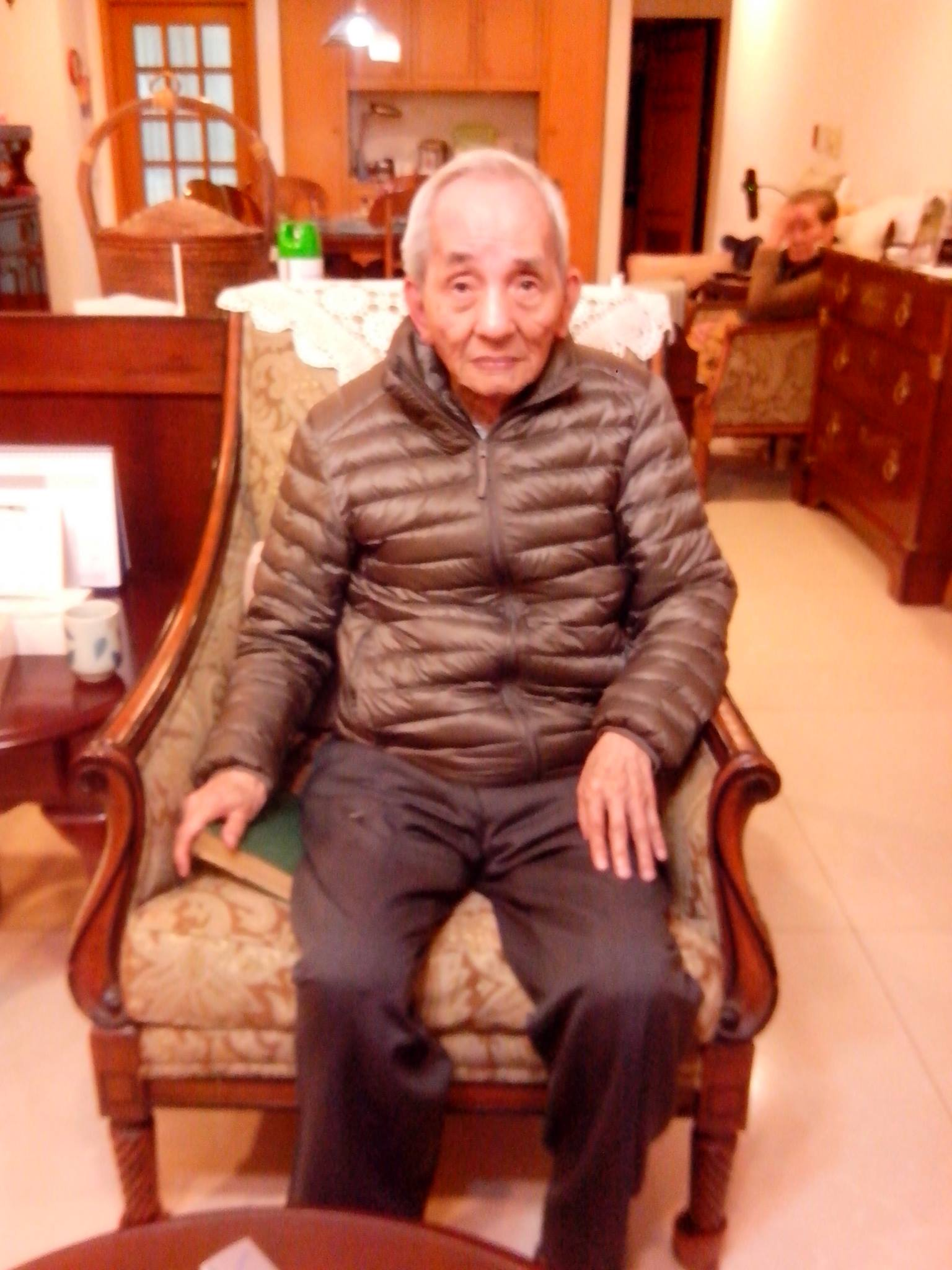
- Hsu Yun-chi in 2016
- Born: July 16, 1924; Waipu Village, Dajia District, Taichū Prefecture, Taiwan under Japanese rule
- Died: 2025
- Education: Taichung First Senior High School, Kyoto Imperial University, National Taiwan University
- Known for: Completing, with Dai Yungui and others, the first artificial nuclear disintegration experiment in Taiwan and in post-war Asia
- Awards: 1992 Special Contribution Award of the Physical Society of the Republic of China
- Scientific career
- Fields: Nuclear physics
- Workplaces: Department of Physics, National Taiwan University
- Notable students: Lin Qingliang

Hsu Yun-chi (Chinese: 許雲基; 16 July 1924 – 2025) was a Taiwanese nuclear physicist from Taichung, Taiwan. After graduating from Taichung First Senior High School, Hsu studied at Kochi High School in Japan and then at the Faculty of Engineering of Kyoto Imperial University. After the war, he transferred to the Department of Electrical Engineering at National Taiwan University and graduated from that department.

In 1947, Hsu became an assistant in the Department of Physics, National Taiwan University. Together with Dai Yungui, Ota Yoritsune and others, he helped reconstruct the Cockcroft–Walton generator built at NTU by the team of Bunsaku Arakatsu, which had previously completed the world's second artificial nuclear disintegration experiment. In 1948, the group successfully completed the first artificial nuclear disintegration experiment in Taiwan and in post-war Asia. He later took over the nuclear physics laboratory led by Ota Yoritsune, and led Taiwanese technicians in repeatedly improving the laboratory's equipment, making it one of Asia's most advanced nuclear laboratories in the 1960s. Hsu was promoted from assistant to lecturer, associate professor and professor, and became chair of the NTU Department of Physics in 1962. He retired from the NTU Department of Physics in 1985 and became professor emeritus in 1989. Beginning in 2005, he led the reconstruction of the nuclear physics laboratory into the NTU Museum of Physics.

== Life ==
=== Early life ===
Hsu Yun-chi was born in 1924 in Waipu Village, Dajia District, Taichū Prefecture, Taiwan under Japanese rule. (Note: Now Waipu District, Taichung.) After graduating from Taichung Prefectural First Middle School—today Taichung First Senior High School—he went to Japan to study at Kochi High School. After graduating, he was admitted to the Faculty of Engineering of Kyoto Imperial University. While studying there, he attended courses taught by Bunsaku Arakatsu and learned that Kiichi Kimura and others in the university's atomic nucleus laboratory were conducting nuclear experiments.

After World War II, Hsu transferred from the Department of Electrical Engineering at Kyoto Imperial University to the Department of Electrical Engineering at NTU, graduating in the summer of 1947. Shortly before graduation, Zhang Tiaoxu, an assistant in the Department of Chemistry and Hsu's classmate at Taichung First Senior High School, recommended him to the nuclear disintegration experimental group of the Department of Physics, National Taiwan University. Associate professor Ota Yoritsune hoped that Hsu would report for duty the day after graduation. Hsu, however, first returned to his family home in Dajia for a period of rest and did not return to Taipei until late September, formally beginning work in the NTU Department of Physics in October. For this, Hsu received a severe reprimand. According to Xu Zhongping, Hsu Yun-chi was gentle and modest, and often unconsciously covered his mouth with one hand while speaking, a habit he retained into old age.

=== Career at the NTU Department of Physics ===
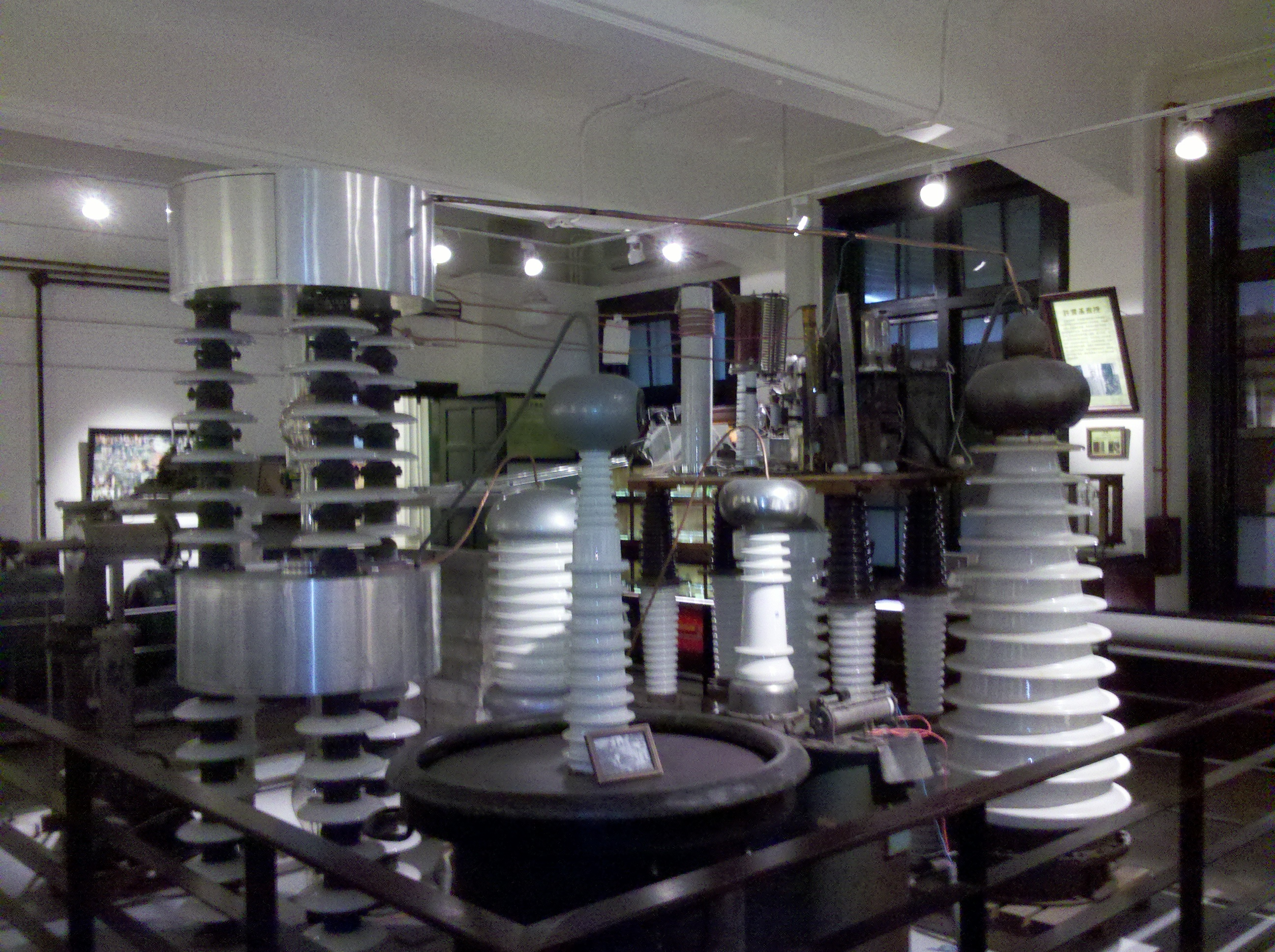
The Cockcroft–Walton linear particle accelerator now displayed at the NTU Museum of Physics.

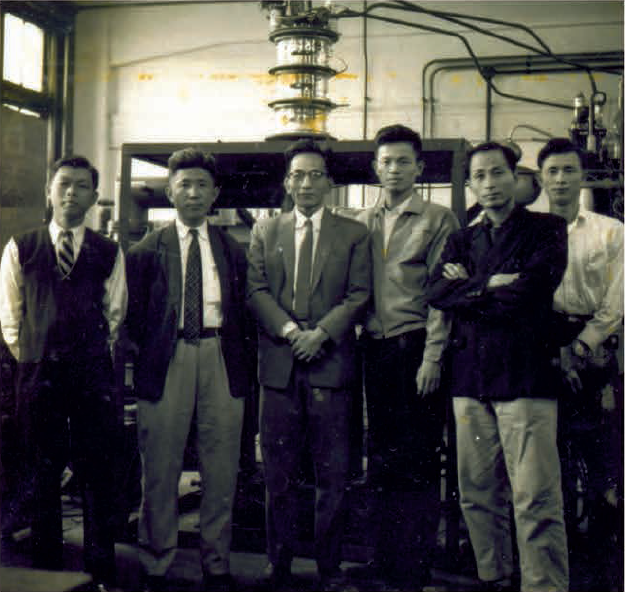
Members of the NTU Department of Physics nuclear laboratory: Xu Dongtang, Zhou Muchun, Hsu Yun-chi, Liu Yuanzhong, Lin Songyun and Xu Yuchuan.

After Hsu reported to Ota Yoritsune in October 1947 and became an assistant in the department, Ota arranged for him to live in a red-brick house behind the meteorological building. Hsu first repaired the department's Geiger counter and then began learning vacuum techniques.

Hsu then followed Dai Yungui and Ota Yoritsune, working with Kawada Suekichi and Taiwanese technicians including Xu Yuchuan, Zhou Mucun and Lin Songyun, to reassemble the Cockcroft–Walton generator made at NTU by Arakatsu's team, which had completed the world's second artificial nuclear disintegration experiment. (Note: For details of this event, see Bunsaku Arakatsu.)

To obtain sufficient experimental materials, they borrowed from the better-supplied Department of Chemistry and obtained discarded vacuum tubes, large shell casings and other items from the Broadcasting Corporation of China and Taiwan Power Company.

The accelerator reconstruction project began in October 1946. On 13 May 1948 at 8:35 p.m., the team used high-speed protons to strike lithium, splitting it into two alpha particles and completing the first artificial nuclear disintegration experiment in Taiwan and post-war Asia. On 20 June of the same year, they repeated the experiment and confirmed the reproducibility of the results.

To keep pace with the work, Hsu left his newly married wife at his family home in Dajia and often slept overnight in the laboratory with Ota Yoritsune, Xu Yuchuan and Lin Songyun, continuing work after waking. The accelerator is now displayed by National Taiwan University in the NTU Museum of Physics, the former nuclear laboratory of the physics chair. Recalling the construction of the accelerator, Hsu said, “Hey! How did we have so much energy back then?” When asked whether they feared electric leakage and radiation from the accelerator, he replied:

We were terribly afraid, but it seems we did not die. When the first experiment succeeded in striking lithium atoms, we watched with our eyes. When the rays came out, we were so excited that we used no shielding at all. But everyone lived into their seventies or eighties, and it seems nothing happened.

In 1949, after Ota Yoritsune was affected by the February 28 incident and repatriated to Japan by the Government of the Republic of China, Hsu took over Ota's laboratory. He then led Taiwanese technicians in repeatedly improving the nuclear physics laboratory. First, his team built a Wilson cloud chamber to observe alpha particle tracks, improving on Ota's earlier apparatus, which could observe but not record the tracks. They then modified the accelerator to produce high-energy neutrons and raise the level of nuclear reactions. Using helium-4 reactions, they produced 14.1 MeV high-energy neutrons to study induced nuclear reactions. Hsu's team also converted the accelerator's ion source into an RF antenna ion source, and later thoroughly rebuilt the accelerator into a heavy ion accelerator for ion sputtering experiments. In addition, the research team used a mercury rectifier tube made from a Pyrex beaker and discarded high-power vacuum-tube electrodes from the Broadcasting Corporation of China to produce heavy water. After about a year of effort, they successfully produced 98% heavy water.

On 1 March 1954, the United States tested a hydrogen bomb at Bikini Atoll, causing serious radioactive contamination in nearby waters. Contaminated fish from the area were transported back to Taiwan. The Taiwan Provincial Fishermen's Association, now the National Fishermen's Association, Republic of China, brought the fish to the lobby of NTU Building No. 2, where they were tested for radioactivity using a Geiger counter made by Xu's team.

In the 1960s, Hsu's team began making carbon-14 detectors, mainly to understand the influence of post-war atmospheric nuclear testing on radioactivity in Taiwanese rice. They found that the radiocarbon content of Taiwanese trees was higher than that of European trees. At the time, the team used radiocarbon dating to assist the NTU Department of Archaeology and Anthropology, now the Department of Anthropology, with artifact identification and the Department of Geology with fossil and stratigraphic research. The team was the only group in Taiwan with this technology at the time. The dating of the Changbin culture site was completed during this period by the team led by Hsu. They also hoped to use the technique to measure changes in cosmic rays.

The research by Hsu's team made the NTU Department of Physics nuclear laboratory one of Asia's most advanced nuclear laboratories in the 1960s, and the team published nearly thirty papers. In 1961, Hsu, then an associate professor, received funding from the International Atomic Energy Agency to conduct a two-year research project at the Japan Atomic Energy Research Institute in Tokai, Ibaraki. During his career at the NTU Department of Physics, Hsu advanced through publications from assistant to lecturer, associate professor and professor, and became department chair in October 1962. In 1965, when Taiwan's National Science Council established a Physics Research Center, Hsu and Wolfgang Kroll became chair professors representing the NTU Department of Physics at the center.

=== Later years ===
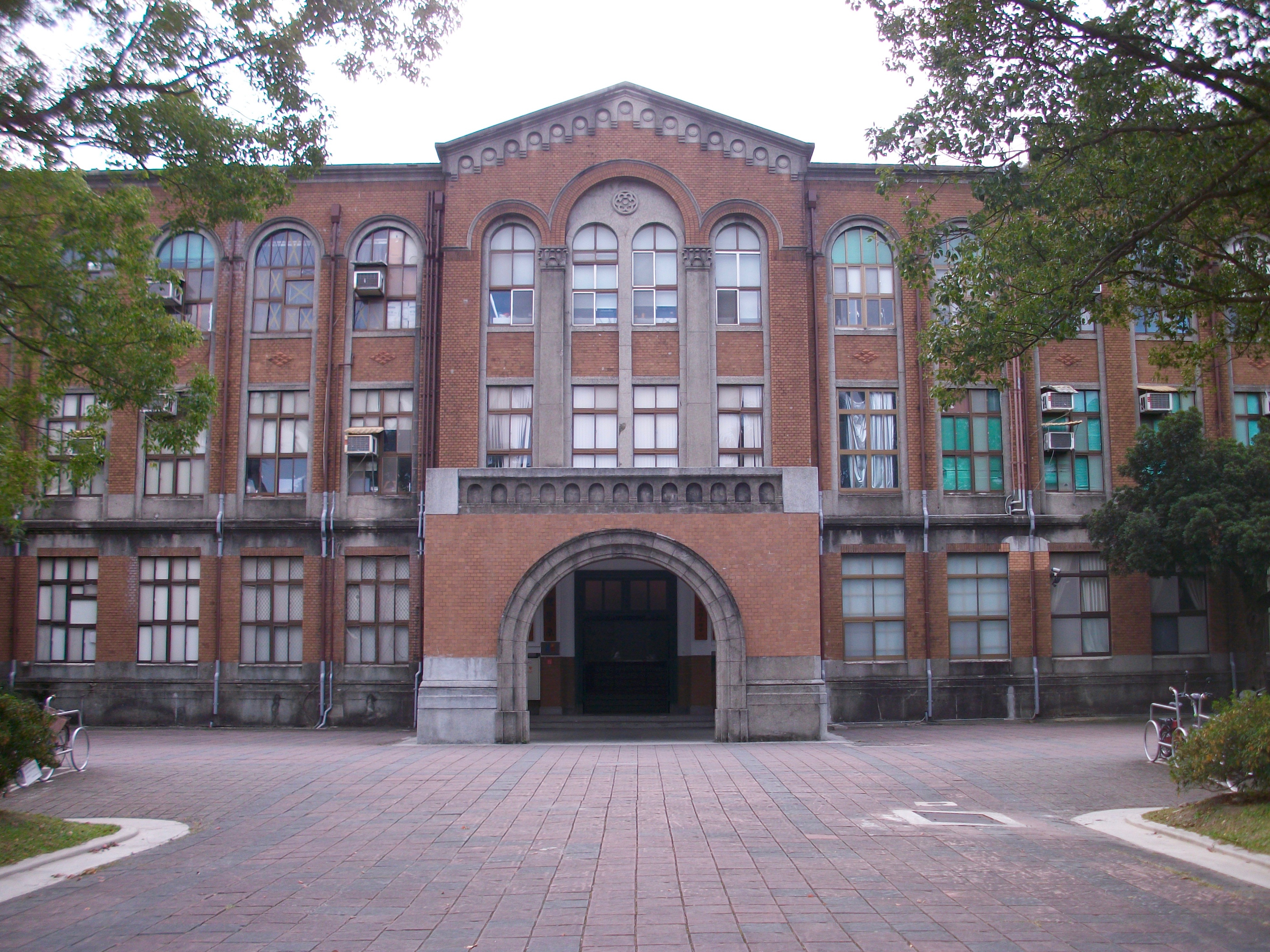
The Taihoku Imperial University physics and chemistry classroom building, completed on 3 May 1931. It houses the NTU Museum of Physics, formerly the nuclear laboratory.

Hsu retired from the NTU Department of Physics in 1985 and, in 1989, became professor emeritus together with Wolfgang Kroll. After his retirement, the accelerator was dismantled because of a lack of space in the nuclear physics laboratory. Technicians Lin Songyun and Xu Yuchuan, unwilling to abandon it, hid its parts in various places for nearly twenty years. The two even stored the parts in warehouses, basements and bathroom ceilings.

In 2004, the NTU Department of Physics decided to reconstruct the accelerator. Beginning in 2005, Hsu, together with Lin Songyun and Xu Yuchuan, led the reconstruction of the nuclear physics laboratory into the NTU Museum of Physics, which officially opened on 21 November that year. The reconstruction process was made into the documentary Breaking Through the Atomic Nucleus. Hsu summarized his thirty-eight-year teaching career by saying: “It was a very difficult era, but everyone was very serious.”

== Works ==
- A Study of the Ionosphere, 1948.
- “Neutron Total Cross Section of Arsenic at 14 MeV”, 1963.
- “Counting Efficiency of Nuclear Multiplate Camera”, 1963.
- “Neutron Total Cross Section of Praseodymium at 14 MeV”, 1963.
- “Radiocarbon Concentration in Taiwan Wood”, 1964.
- “Low Background Counter for Carbon-14 Dating”, 1965.
- “Energy and Angular Distribution of Alpha-Particles in the Ar40(n,α)S37 Reaction at 14.1 MeV”, 1965.
- “Carbon-14 Dating. I”, 1965.
- “Measurement of Radiocarbon Content in Rice”, 1966.
- “Energy and Angular Distribution of Alpha Particles in the 14N(n,0)11B Reaction at 14.1 MeV”, 1968.
- “Wilson Cloud Chamber for the Study of the (n, α) Reaction”, 1968.
- “12C(n,α)9Be Reaction at 14.1 MeV”, 1969.
- “20Ne(n, α)17O Reaction Induced by 14.1 MeV Neutrons”, 1972.
- “40Ca(n, α)37Ar Reaction at 14.1 MeV”, 1973.
- “DWBA Analysis of the 12C(n, α0)9Be Reaction at 14.1 MeV”, 1974.
- “Counter Telescope for Studying 14 MeV Neutron-Induced Reactions”, 1975.
- “Surface Treatment of the Al Cold Cathode for He-Ne Laser”, 1975.
- “Investigation of the 32S(n, α)29Si Reaction at 14.1 MeV”, 1976.

== See also ==
- Bunsaku Arakatsu
- Kawada Suekichi
- Ota Yoritsune
- Xu Yuchuan
- Department of Physics, National Taiwan University
- NTU Museum of Physics

== Notes ==
Academic offices
Preceded by Dai Yungui	Chair of the Department of Physics, National Taiwan University; October 1962 – July 1966	Succeeded by Huang Zhenlin
