= Wolfgang Kroll =

20th century German Physicist

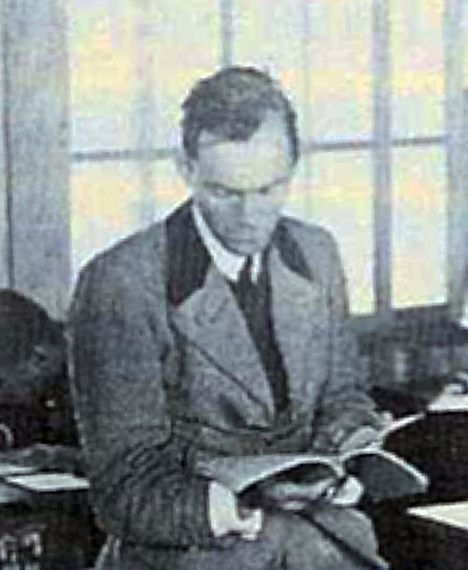
- Born: March 21, 1906; Greifswald, German Empire (now Greifswald, Mecklenburg-West Pomerania )
- Died: February 28, 1992 (85 years old); National Taiwan University Hospital, Zhongzheng District, Taipei City, Taiwan
- Education: University of Breslau
- Known for: Taiwan's first Ph.D. professor of physics after the war
- Scientific career
- Fields: theoretical physics
- Workplaces: Hokkaido Imperial University; Tokyo Institute of Physics and Chemistry; Taipei Imperial University; National Taiwan University
- Thesis: Quantum Mechanics of Dispersion and Magnetic Spin in Dirac's Electron Theory (Quantum Mechanics of Dispersion and Magnetic Spin in Dirac's Electron Theory (1930))

Wolfgang Kroll (March 21, 1906 – February 28, 1992) was a German physicist who received his doctorate in physics from the University of Breslau in 1930. He spent the next few years in Leipzig conducting postdoctoral research with Werner Heisenberg.

Due to the power of the Nazi Party, Kroll left Germany in 1937 to teach in Hokkaido, Japan, and then arrived in the Japanese colony of Taipei in 1941, where he taught at the Preparatory Department of the Taihoku Imperial University. After the war, Kroll was invited to transfer to the Department of Physics as the university was renamed as National Taiwan University. He was promoted to associate professor and then to professor. He was the first full-time professor in Taiwan to hold a doctorate in theoretical physics after the war. Afterward, he was invited to teach in the Department of Physics of Tunghai University.

In August 1976, Kroll retired from the Department of Physics at National Taiwan University and became an honorary professor along with Xu Yunji the following year. After his retirement, Kroll also taught part-time at the Chinese Culture University and other places. In the late 1970s, as Taiwan's economy began to take off, prices rose and Kroll's pension became relatively meagre, leaving him in a difficult position. On February 28, 1992, Kroll died of emphysema at National Taiwan University Hospital at the age of 87.

== Life ==
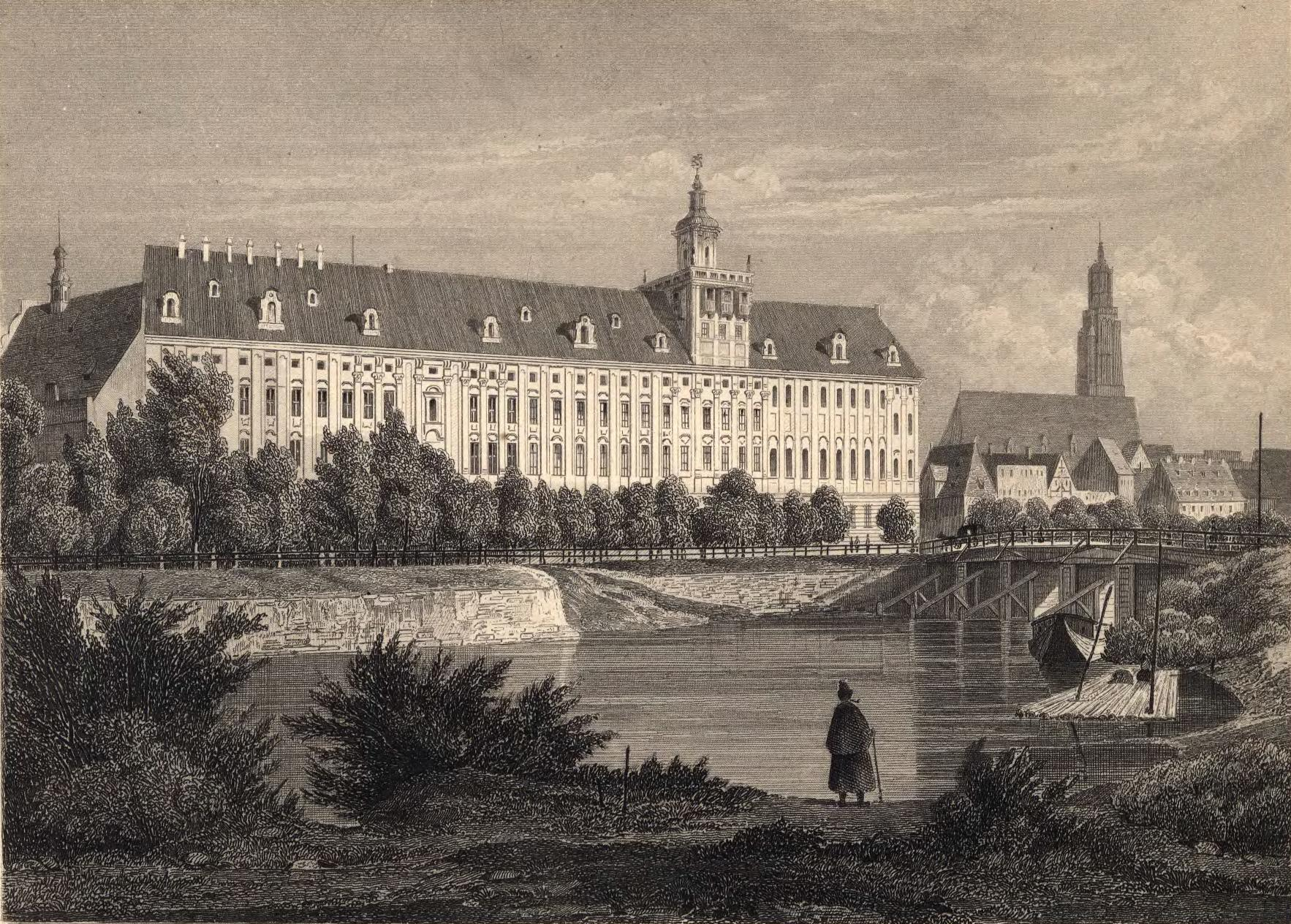
The old look of the University of Breslau

=== Early years ===
Wolfgang Kröll was born on March 21, 1906, in Greifswald in the northern part of the German Empire. When he was a child, Kroll experienced the First World War, when Germany was short of supplies and the elephants in the zoo were shot and killed, leading Kroll to eat their flesh. In the late 1920s, Kroll entered the University of Breslau (Note: Currently the University of Wroclaw in Poland.) where he studied theoretical physics and received his Ph.D. in physics from the university in 1930 with a thesis on Dirac's electron theory. In the same year, he received a fellowship from the German Science Aid Organization and went to Leipzig University to do postdoctoral research under Werner Heisenberg (Note: Winner of the 1933 Nobel Prize in Physics.) for seven years. During this period, he also met Edward Teller, who would become the father of the hydrogen bomb. Between 1930 and 1937, Kroll published eight papers on quantum mechanics, magnetisation spectra, and thermoelectric effects, laying the foundation for his future independent research. After the Nazis gained power, Kroll often criticised current affairs. Although he was not Jewish, he was in danger because he was disliked by those in power. Therefore, with the help of his father and the university, Kroll began a solo exile to Japan in 1937. Kroll stated that he chose to go to Japan to see the "fascinating East" and that he and his father had many friends in Japan.

There are two accounts of the way Kroll left Germany. According to Xu Zhongping, Kroll exchanged with Shin'ichirō Tomonaga (Note: Japan's second Nobel Laureate in Physics.) in Japan, while another theory suggests that Kroll's journey to Japan was arranged by his father. Kroll first went to London and then to Japan via Shanghai, finally arriving in Hokkaido.

=== Travel to Japan ===
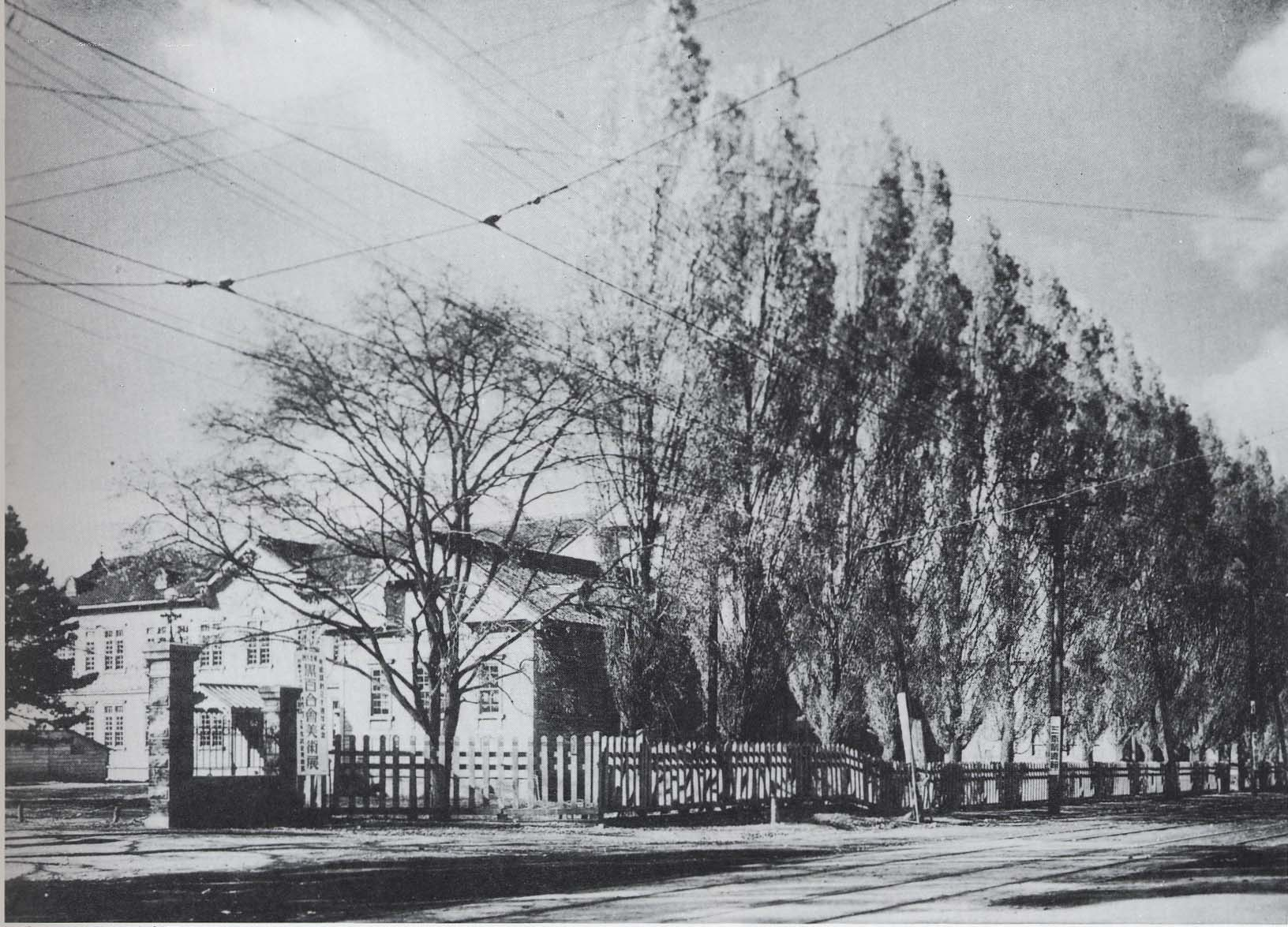
The main gate of Hokkaido Imperial University, taken in 1934

After arriving in Hokkaido, Kroll went to Hokkaido University, (Note: It was originally the Sapporo Agricultural School established in 1886, and it was changed to this name in 1918) where he was a lecturer for five years beginning in 1937. At that time, he published three papers in five years with Tomonaga Shin'ichiro, who had just graduated from the physics department of Kyoto Imperial University, and also co-organized a course on quantum theory with Tomonaga. In 1937, with the support of Yoshio Nishina, Kroll published a paper on the theory of thermal conduction, and in 1941, he published a paper on the behaviour of free electrons in monovalent metals and their relation to specific heat. However, since the salary at the Hokkaido Imperial University was not high, Kroll took a part-time job as a teacher of German at a nearby commercial school. After the outbreak of World War II, Kroll left Hokkaido University to teach at the Institute of Physical and Chemical Research in Tokyo, and soon after left Japan to teach at Taipei Imperial University. At the end of 1941, Kroll arrived in Taiwan to teach at the Imperial University of Taipei. His salary was increased by 60%. However, the lecture system at that time did not allow Kroll to hold a lecture in physics, but only to teach German courses in the preparation and higher schools in Taipei. It was not until the end of the war that he began to teach physics. From April 20, 1945, all prep teachers and students, including Kroll, were engaged in position construction between Tamsui and Xinzhuang from that month onwards and were disbanded and reinstated after the war. He published a paper on mathematical physics in 1944 through the Proceedings of the Faculty of Science of the Imperial University of Taipei.

=== Post-war period ===
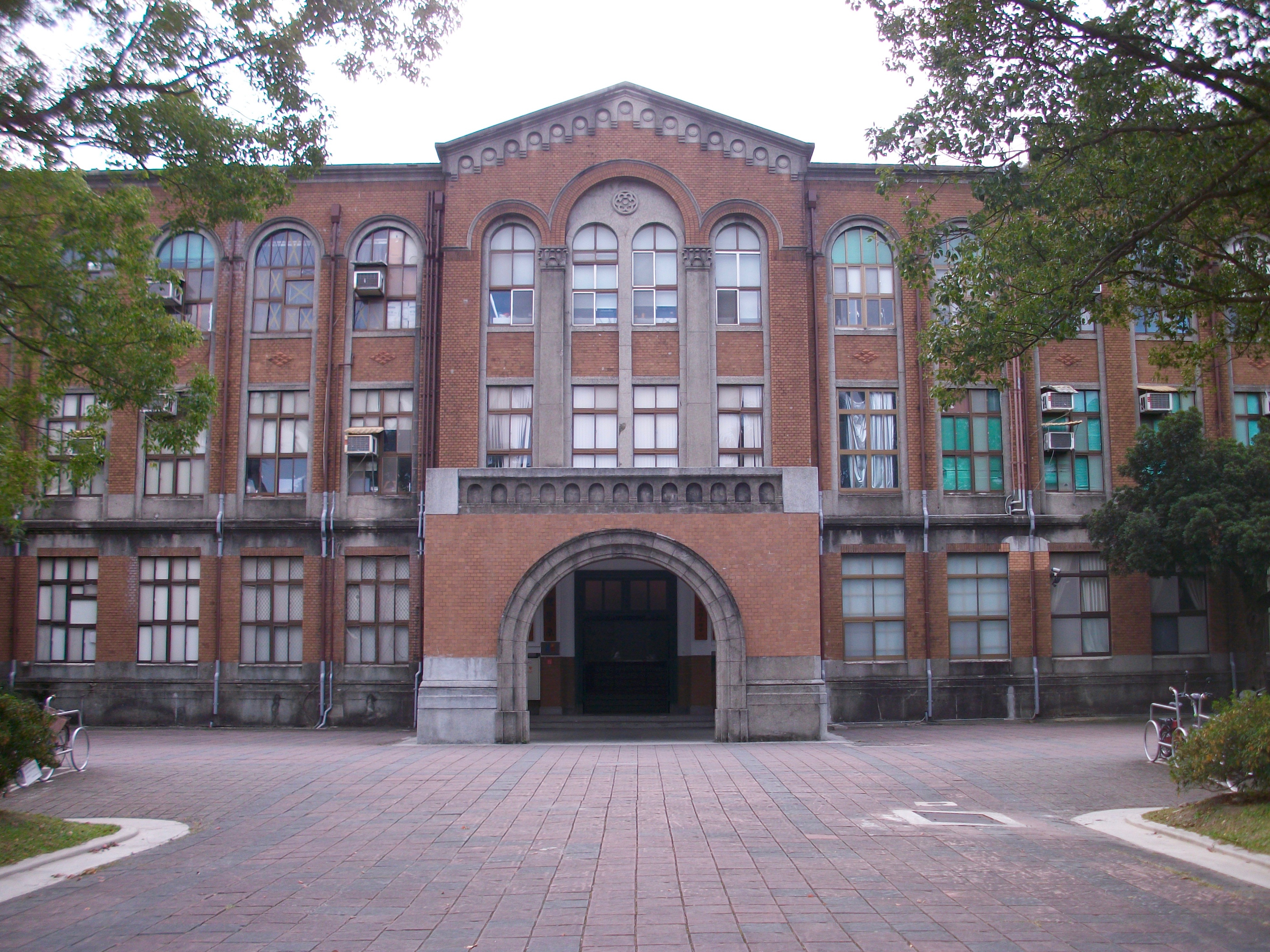
The NTU Physics Department Building in the early years (NTU Building No. 2)

After the war, the Nationalist government took over Taiwan. Lo Tsung-lo, who was in charge of receiving the Taipei Imperial University, became the first acting president of NTU after the war, and invited Kroll to stay at NTU; Kroll was promoted from lecturer to associate professor and transferred to the Department of Physics to teach physics and German. However, after Lo left office, there were rumours that Kroll would be demoted because he was a national of a defeated country. After Fu Sinian became the president of National Taiwan University, he was encouraged to stay in the office again, and his salary was raised at the same time. Kroll was also invited to participate in the May 24, 1951 discussion of the freshman curriculum setting program, and Kroll was the only foreign faculty member at that meeting.

In 1948, a paper by Kroll on the study of the electron radius was published in the Japanese Journal of Arts and Sciences, which became the first paper published in an international scientific journal by a faculty member of the Department of Physics at NTU. In 1950, Kroll completed his research on the specific heat of solids alone. His research paper on this topic was published in 1952 in Developments in Theoretical Physics published in Kyoto, Japan, and he was promoted to full professor in 1954. During this period, Kroll mentored assistant professor Huang Zhenlin in his research on the specific heat of solids and frequency spectra. He also completed a revision of the Houston method in 1955, using interpolation to determine the ISO-frequency spectral map, avoiding the singularity problem of the original Houston method at the high-frequency end. He also wrote a paper on his research results and published it in Physical Review that year, which became the first paper by a Taiwanese scholar in this journal.

Since then, almost all the theoretical physics courses in the Department of Physics at NTU had been taught by Kroll, including courses in theoretical physics, quantum mechanics, relativity, statistical mechanics, physical mathematics, electronics, and other theoretical courses.

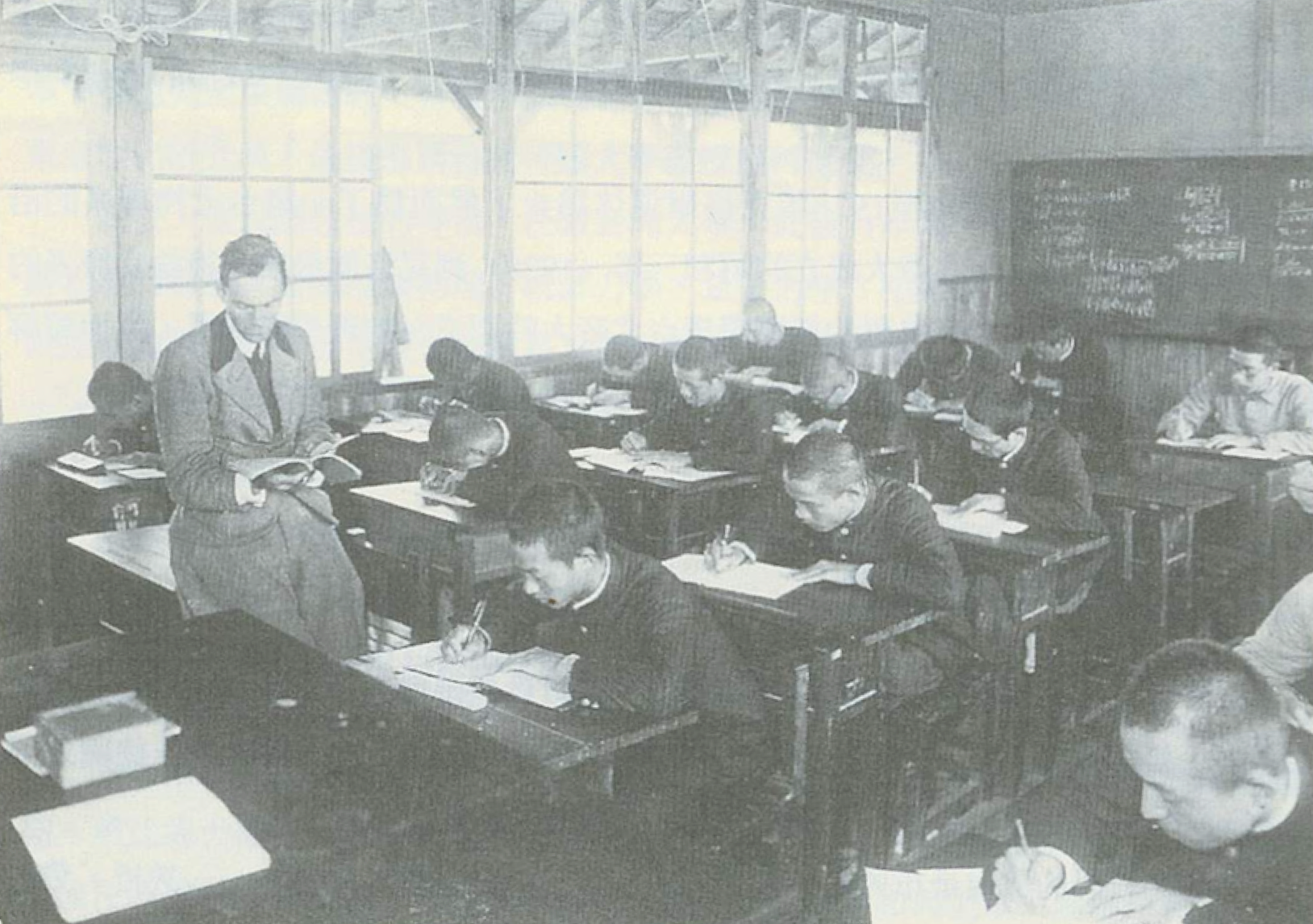
Kroll's early teaching situation

His theoretical physics courses were mainly based on the textbooks written by the German physicist Arnold Sommerfeld, whose contents were compiled into a notebook for use as a textbook. Kroll would print handouts for his students, but left the formulae blank and asked them to fill them in during the class.

Before the 1970s, Kroll was the only full-time professor in Taiwan with a PhD in theoretical physics. However, because of the priority given to experimental physics in the early years of the Department of Physics at NTU, theoretical physics was relatively unappreciated, and Kroll did not have any research labs in the department, or even a dedicated desk. Because Kroll found Chinese difficult to learn and did not know Taiwanese Hokkien or Taiwanese Mandarin, he taught in English with a German accent. He would ask students to "stand and salute" and then sit down before starting the lesson. Kroll did not smile in class and hardly mentioned his research, preferring to teach in hunting clothes or European tuxedos and copying equations all over the blackboard, which students had to copy. However, Kroll preferred Japanese to English when talking to students.

The early physics students had more contact with Kroll because they had studied Japanese, but the later students had less contact. In the early postwar period, many professors who came to Taiwan with the Nationalist government used the Shanghai dialect or Zhejiang dialect to teach their classes. Taiwanese students could not understand them, so they asked Kroll for advice in Japanese during their spare time. Sometimes teachers and students would drink together. When a student drifted out of the window during Kroll's lecture, Kroll threw chalk at him and angrily exclaimed, "Is the blackboard outside the window?" If a student dozed off during class or was late and left early, Kroll would throw chalk at them, and if a student talked privately during class, he would pound his face on the table and reprimand them. Kroll always graded students in whole multiples of ten (e.g., 60, 80) and never gave grades such as 56 or 85, similar to the future grading system. This is because he believed that the difference of a few points was not meaningful, so the scores should not be divided.

In 1957, Kroll was invited to teach part-time at Tunghai University by Wang Shuofu, then chair of that university's physics department. Since then, Kroll taught three days a week at Tunghai University and three days a week at NTU, travelling between North and Central Taiwan. Kroll's course at Tunghai included both optics and theoretical physics. In 1960, with the support and the award of the National Council on Science Development, (Note: Current Ministry of Science and Technology of the Republic of China) Kroll published two more papers on solid-specific heat-related research, building on his 1952 paper. In the following year, he became the only "National Research Chair Professor" at the Physical Research Center of the National Council on Science Development and continued his research in the fields of specific heat magnetoresistance, and mathematical physics. During this period, Kroll used quantum theory to calculate the equation for the specific heat of free electrons in metals and further calculated the distribution function of bound electrons to find the magnetic permeability of metals, replacing the original method of using the effective mass to calculate.

By 1963, Kroll, together with his graduate students, did research on the De Haas-Van Alphen effect of bound electrons and used the expression for the magnetic permeability by spreading the lattice's potential energy in a Fourier series. He also worked with his students to study the solution of the electromagnetic wave equation of a waveguide with internal wrinkles and to find its waveguide coefficient, and his results were published in the Chinese Journal of Physics between 1963 and 1967. In 1967, Kroll also published a paper on the development of function classes satisfying a particular integral formula in the same journal. Students taught by Kroll said that he was also interested in electromagnetic differential equations with different boundary conditions and that Bessel functions were like "old friends to him". By 1972, Kroll was mainly devoted to problems related to elasticity theory. Influenced by the training he received in his early years, his research during this period skewed toward the area of mathematical computation.

=== Later years ===
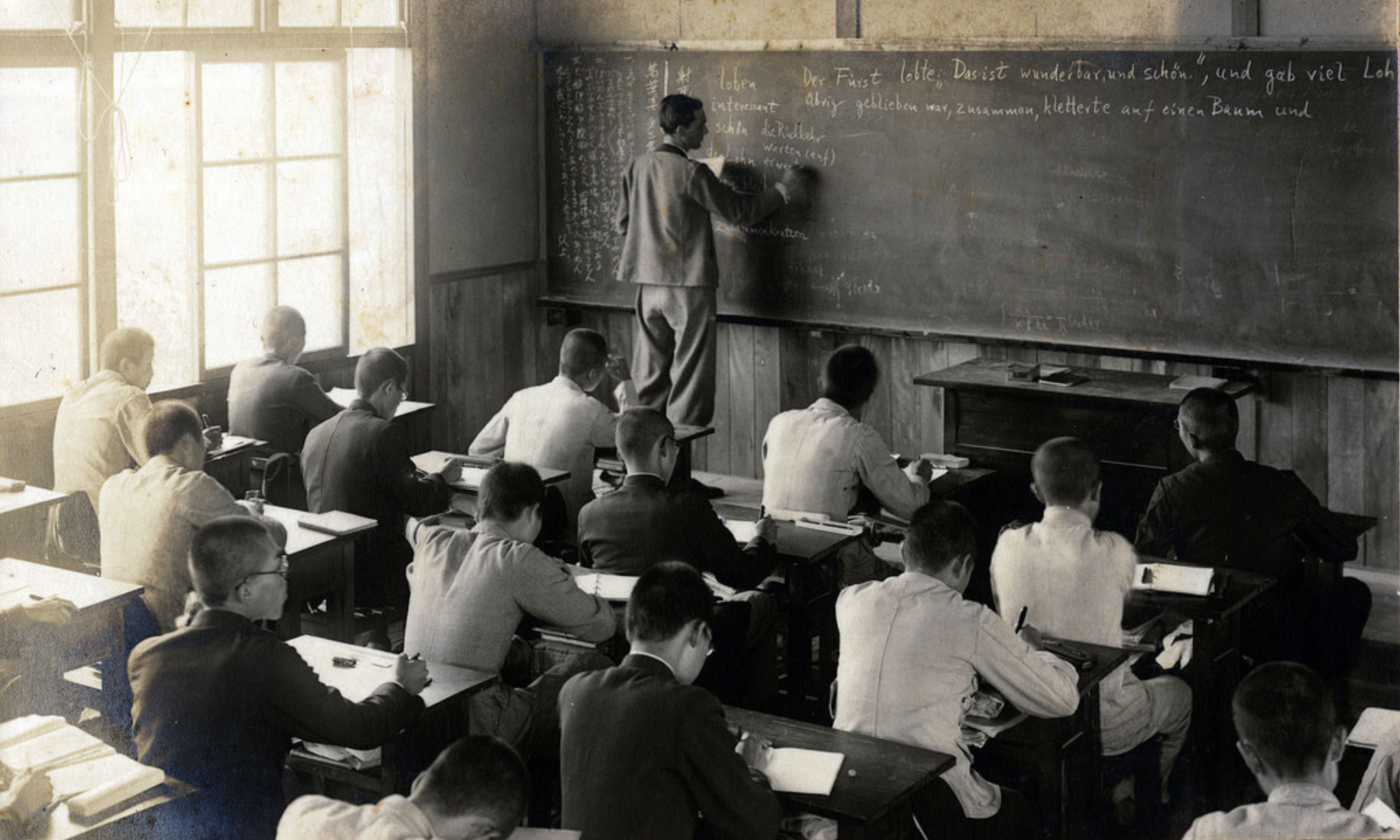
The situation of Kroll teaching German in the preparatory course at Taipei Imperial University

In August 1976, Kroll retired from the Department of Physics at NTU and continued to live at Taipei University. At that time, Kroll stated that he did not want to retire, but had to leave the campus because he had reached the university's retirement age. According to Kroll's estimation, he taught about 2,000 to 3,000 students during his 30 years of teaching at NTU. In 1988, at the suggestion of his early students, including Chang Kow-lung and Ching-Liang Lin, Huang Huili, then head of the Department of Physics, proposed to the university that Kroll be awarded an honorary professorship. The following year, Kroll became an honorary professor along with Xu Yunji. During his retirement, Kroll taught at the Department of Physics of the Chinese Cultural Institute, (Note: Currently Cultural University) and also taught at Taipei Medical University. He also joined the Old Taiwan Club, which was founded by expatriates in Taiwan on December 6, 1980, and was selected as the "Oldest Taiwanese" at a gathering in March of the following year.

However, in the late 1970s, as Taiwan's economy began to take off, prices rose, making Kroll's pension insufficient to provide for his medical needs when he became ill. As a result, he was assisted by a group of people, including students who had been taught by Kroll in his early premedical German classes. In 1991, Professor Yang Xinnan, the head of the Department of Physics at NTU, initiated the "Professor Kroll Fund" and raised more than NT$ 1 million in a very short period. The doctor in charge of Kroll's care would also call him frequently to check on his health, but soon Kroll would impatiently respond to him in Japanese: "I can't die!".

In January 1991, Kroll was admitted to NTU Hospital with asthma and oedema, from which he recovered. However, in February 1992, Kroll suffered a recurrence of emphysema and died at 11:00 a.m. on February 28 at NTU Hospital at the age of 87. The funeral service was conducted by Pastor Luo Rongguang, who later became the General Administrator of the Presbyterian Church in Taiwan. The funeral committee was composed of faculty members from the Department of Physics of NTU and students from Kroll's early career as a premedical student, to help his son, who had rushed to Taiwan from Japan to handle the funeral. Professor Kroll's Fund has also been repurposed to hold the "Kroll Memorial Lecture" at the Department of Physics of National Taiwan University every year.

== Influence ==
Kroll has been described as "the Prometheus who brought the fire of physics from Germany to Taiwan" and most of the early Taiwanese physicists were his students. Huang Zhenlin, who later became the head of the Department of Physics at NTU, served as Kroll's assistant professor when he was young. Influenced by Kroll, Huang Zhenlin also devoted himself to research in the field of solid-specific heat. Their discussion was later published in the German Handbuch der Physik. Hong-Yee Chiu, the first Taiwanese astrophysicist to receive NASA's top honorary award for outstanding achievement and the first in the world to name a quasar, said that Kroll was "one of his most respected teachers". He said that if he had not been taught quantum mechanics, statistical mechanics, and theoretical physics by Kroll, he "would not have been able to enter the research field so quickly". In 1996, the Department of Physics at the University of Massachusetts Dartmouth and the Department of Physics at NTU jointly organised the Kroll Memorial Symposium and published a collection of papers after the symposium.

During his lifetime, Kroll lived in an old Japanese-style dormitory near the intersection of South Xinsheng Road and East Heping Road, even though the university wanted to let him change dormitories. Kroll was worried about moving his belongings and was reluctant to leave the dormitory where he had lived for more than 30 years, therefore, they insisted on not replacing it and thought that doing so would preserve the site for NTU. Later, many Japanese dormitories in the area were converted, but the 150-ping dormitory of Kroll was preserved. After Kroll's death, the dormitory was returned to the National Taiwan University, and the school signed a contract with Chen Dengshou and others to revitalize and update the building, and then they transformed the building into a European-style art restaurant.

=== Personal life ===
Kroll's father was a professor of linguistic literature, (Note: There are also sources who identify him as a professor of theology and possibly both.) taught at the University of Breslau, and was a high-ranking German government official with a prominent family background. Kroll's brother was a medical doctor, in addition to Kroll's younger brother. Kroll was unmarried for the rest of his life, but he had a son and a middle-aged woman who helped him with household chores for many years. In addition, Kroll had a lover in Taiwan, who placed the last flower on the coffin during Kroll's funeral.

== See also ==
- National Taiwan University Heritage Hall of Physics
