= Bunsaku Arakatsu =

Japanese physics professor (1890–1973)

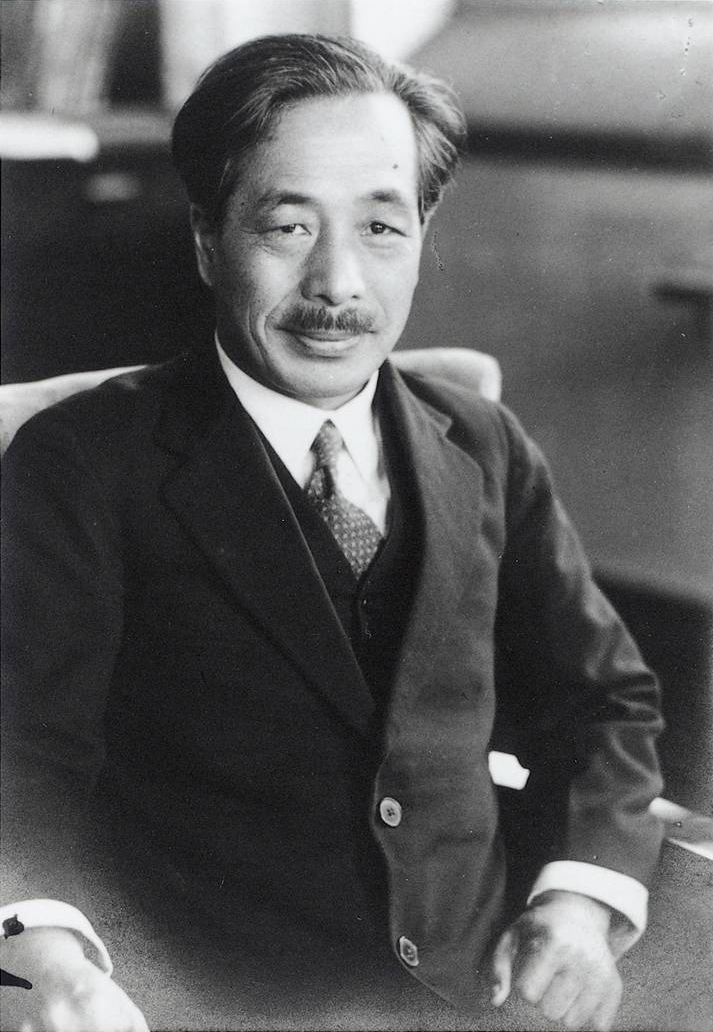
- Born: March 25, 1890; Himeji, Hyōgo, Japan
- Died: June 25, 1973 (aged 83); Kobe, Hyōgo, Japan
- Other names: 荒勝文策, あらかつ ぶんさく
- Occupation: Physicist
- Scientific career
- Institutions: Taihoku Imperial University; Kyoto Imperial University; Konan University
- Academic advisors: Albert Einstein, Paul Scherrer

Bunsaku Arakatsu (荒勝文策; あらかつ ぶんさく, 25 March 1890 – 25 June 1973) was a Japanese physics professor in the World War II Japanese Atomic Energy Research Program of the Imperial Japanese Navy. Arakatsu was a former student of Albert Einstein.

== Career ==
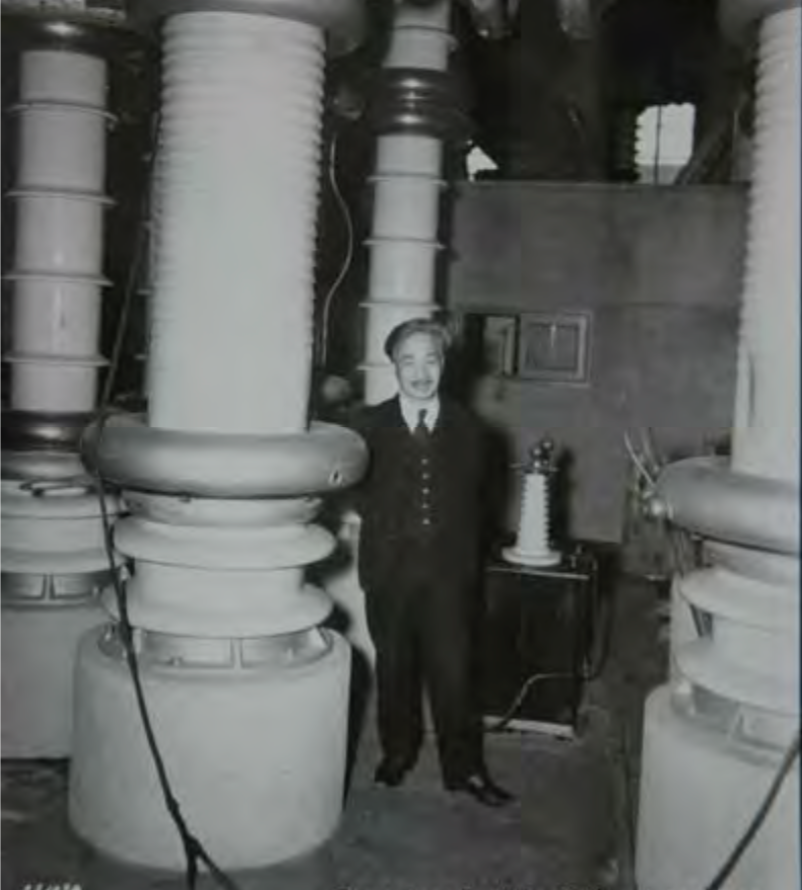
Arakatsu and his accelerator at Kyoto Imperial University.

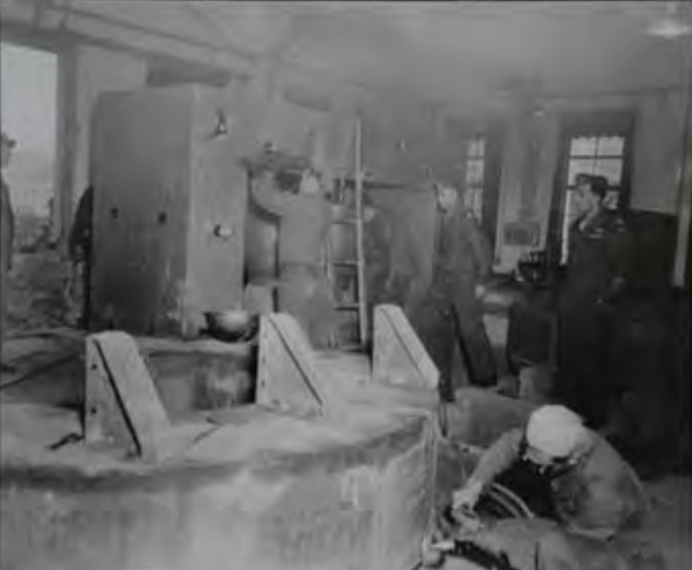
Arakatsu's accelerator being demolished by GHQ.

In 1928, Arakatsu became a professor at Taihoku Imperial University (now called National Taiwan University). In 1934 Arakatsu built a particle accelerator at Taihoku Imperial University in Taihoku, Formosa (now Taipei, Taiwan), and performed the first atomic nucleus collision experiment in Asia there, shortly after the experiment performed at the Cavendish Laboratory of the University of Cambridge. He reported that each nuclear fission of a U-235 atom yields, on average, 2.6 neutrons.

In 1936, he became a professor at Kyoto Imperial University (now called University of Kyoto).

In 1943, during World War II, he led the Japanese Naval research program into nuclear technology, known as the F-Go Project. Alongside Yoshio Nishina, Arakatsu was one of Japan's leading nuclear physicists. His team included Hideki Yukawa, who would become in 1949 the first Japanese physicist to receive a Nobel Prize.

Early on in the war Commander Kitagawa, head of the Navy Research Institute's Chemical Section, had requested Arakatsu to carry out work on the separation of Uranium-235. The work went slowly, but shortly before the end of the war he had designed an ultracentrifuge (to spin at 60,000 rpm) which he hoped would achieve the required results. Only the design of the machinery was completed before the Japanese surrender.

After the Americans atom bombed Hiroshima, he was transferred to Navy Minister Mitsumasa Yonai to form an investigative commission. This commission inspected the affected area to determine the effects of the bomb.

After the war, his reports and artifacts were largely destroyed or confiscated by the occupying GHQ, which brought much protest from Arakatsu and the international community. Whatever documents that had survived the purge are now kept in the Yamato Museum in Kure.

== Bibliography ==
The following are books or papers published by refereed scientific journals:

- The continuous spectrum of Hydrogen associated with each of the lines in the Balmer series, 1932, 1 edition published in English and held by 8 libraries worldwide
- The principle of the conservation of angular momentum or the principle of the conservation of the symmetry or antisymmetry of the total wave function (Bose or Fermi Statistics) in molecules, 1932, 1 edition in English and held by 7 libraries worldwide
- On some peculiar phenomena of the electrodeless ring discharge through Hydrogen in a long tube, 1932, 1 edition published in 1932 in English and held by 7 libraries worldwide
- Notes on the validity of the principle of the conservation of spin angular momentum in the process of the artificial disintegration of lithium atoms, 1934, 1 edition published in English and held by 6 libraries worldwide
- Experimental studies on the artificial transmutation of certain light elements bombarded by ions of hydrogen and heavy hydrogen in English and held by 6 libraries worldwide
- On the anomalous absorption of [gamma]-rays. (The possibility of the quantum jump of the rest-mass of an electron.) 1932, 1 edition in English and held by 5 libraries worldwide
- The electrodeless ring discharge through potassium vapour 1932, 1 edition published in English and held by 5 libraries worldwide
- The activation of air by the electrodeless ring discharge, 1932, 1 edition published in English and held by 5 libraries worldwide
- On the anomalous absorption of -rays, 1932, 1 edition published in English and held by 3 libraries worldwide
- Hiroshima atomic bomb, August 1945 and super-hydrogen bomb test at Bikini Atoll in the mid-Pacific, March 1954, 1995, 1 edition published in English and held by 2 libraries worldwide

== Honors ==
- Medal with Purple Ribbon (1961)
- Order of the Rising Sun, 3rd class (1965)
- Order of the Rising Sun, 2nd class (1973; posthumous)

=== Order of precedence ===
- Third rank (1973; posthumous)

== See also ==
- Japanese nuclear weapons program
- Taihoku Imperial University
- Kyoto Imperial University
