= Japan's non-nuclear weapons policy =

Japan's non-nuclear weapons policy is a policy popularly articulated as the Three Non-Nuclear Principles of non-possession, non-production, and non-introduction of nuclear weapons imposed by Douglas MacArthur during the Allied occupation of Japan following the Second World War.

== Developmental history ==
Following World War II, the atomic bombings, at Hiroshima and Nagasaki and the deconstruction of their imperial military, Japan came under the US "nuclear umbrella" on the condition that they would not produce nuclear weapons. The requirement was imposed by the United States that Japan might develop nuclear weapons, as the technology to develop a nuclear device became known around the world. This was formalized in the Security Treaty Between the United States and Japan, a corollary to the Treaty of Peace with Japan, which authorized the U.S. to deploy military forces in Japan in order "to contribute to the maintenance of the international peace and security in the Far East and to the security of Japan against armed attack from without". The treaty was first invoked in 1953 when, following a series of Japanese airspace violations by Soviet MiG-15s, the Japanese Foreign Ministry requested U.S. intervention.

=== Early public opposition ===
In the years after the occupation, with the atomic bombings of Hiroshima and Nagasaki still fresh in the Japanese consciousness, public sentiment was strongly against the use, and even presence on Japanese soil, of nuclear weapons. This sentiment was evidenced by the widely reported accidental irradiation of the Daigo Fukuryu Maru from a U.S. hydrogen bomb test in 1954. News of the incident aroused public fears over radiation and outcry against atomic and nuclear weapons testing.

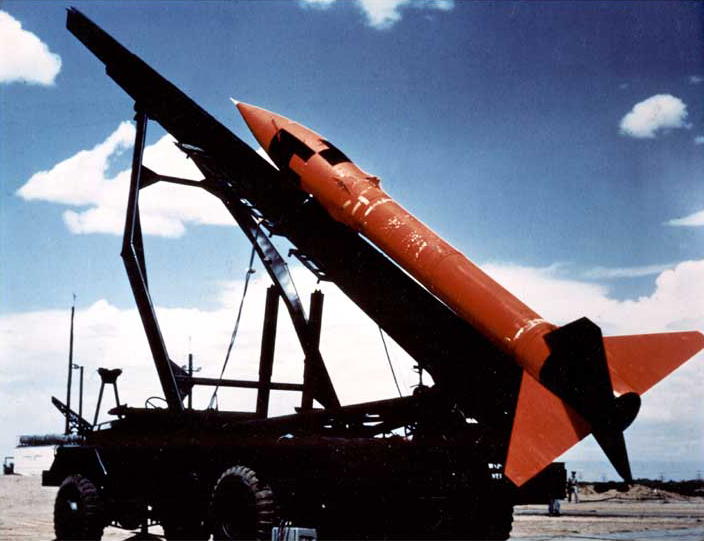
An "Honest John" rocket

On 28 July 1955, the U.S. announced its intention to equip military bases in Japan with Honest Johns, conventional missiles which could also be fitted with atomic warheads. The Eisenhower Administration and Hatoyama Cabinet had been arranging for the deployment since March, but the announcement sparked outrage in the Diet and public protest. Okazaki and Hatoyama were forced to make assurances to the Diet that the missiles would not be equipped with nuclear warheads on Japanese territory, and that the United States would have to consult with the entire government before introducing nuclear weapons into Japan.

The language of the Atomic Energy Basic Law, adopted in December 1955, reflects the public sentiment, restricting "the research, development and utilization of atomic energy" to "peaceful purposes". Nuclear power is used in Japan.

In 1957, Prime Minister Nobusuke Kishi stated his opinion that nuclear weapons were not technically prohibited by Article 9 of the Peace Constitution, though for reasons of humanity and in accordance with popular sentiment national policy should prohibit both their use and introduction. (Even this interpretation of the Constitution, however, drew criticism.) Prime Minister Ikeda Hayato reaffirmed the policy in 1962.

Japanese religious leaders were strongly opposed to nuclear weapons— Josei Toda, second President of the Soka Gakkai, issued a declaration, on 8 September 1957, for the complete abolition of nuclear weapons.

=== Satō's "Four Pillars" Policy ===
Liberal Democratic Party (LDP) President Eisaku Satō was elected Prime Minister in December 1964 (only a month after China revealed its nuclear weapons capability with a test explosion). Although privately supportive of Japanese nuclearization, circumstances led Prime Minister Satō to first articulate the now-standard Three Non-Nuclear Principles, and he is remembered for his contributions to non-proliferation. Most significantly, he was determined to reacquire the island of Okinawa from U.S. occupation. Frustrated by strong public sentiment against the U.S. nuclear presence there, Satō struck a deal with the Johnson Administration, exchanging control of Okinawa for Japan's entry into the Nuclear Non-Proliferation Treaty (NPT).

To ease public misgivings about his administration's nuclear ambitions, Satō introduced the Three Non-Nuclear Principles to the Diet in 1967. Retroactively, to lessen the principles' restriction on Japanese military defense options, in 1968 Satō broadened the principles into the "Four Pillars Nuclear Policy" of (1) promoting the use of nuclear power for peaceful purposes, (2) global nuclear disarmament, (3) reliance on the U.S. nuclear deterrent for protection from nuclear attack, and (4) the Three Principles. In particular, the fourth pillar called for adherence to the principles "under the circumstances where Japan's national security is guaranteed by the other three policies", implying that a change of circumstances might allow Japan to develop a nuclear program. Amid anxiety over U.S. involvement in the Vietnam War, aggression between North and South Korea, and tense Cross-Strait relations, this stipulation served to reassure the Diet that the nuclear option would still be considered if any of the conflicts escalated to threaten Japanese national security.

This policy of nuclear abstention was justified internally by the 1968/1970 Report, the product of a secret study commissioned by the Satō Government (leaked to the public in 1994). The document was a comprehensive cost-benefit analysis of the nuclear option from technical, economic, political, and international perspectives. Ultimately favoring non-nuclearization, the document concluded that the U.S. nuclear deterrent sufficed to deter outside aggression. It also stressed both Japan's extreme vulnerability to nuclear attack (high population density) and the likelihood of international isolation in the wake of a nuclear weapons program. Though Satō thought little of the principles and was pliant in his enforcement of the principle of nonintroduction, in view of popular opinion and the embracing of the policy by the rival Social Democratic Party, he and the LDP also remained vocally supportive.

In 1970, as desired by the U.S. but after much hesitation and with some key stipulations, Japan signed the NPT; and in 1972, relieved of U.S. nuclear weapons, Okinawa reverted to Japanese rule. The Diet passed a resolution formally adopting the principles in 1971, though they were not made law. Eisaku Satō was presented with the Nobel Peace Prize in 1974, in large part for his work toward Japan's entry into the NPT. In his Nobel Lecture (on the seventh anniversary of his original statement to the Diet), Satō reiterated and discussed the Three Non-Nuclear Principles and expressed hope and confidence that future governments would adopt them as well.

== Further influence ==
Opinion polls have consistently revealed that public opinion is overwhelmingly opposed to nuclearization, as several events over the decades following World War II, even after the end of the Cold War, have demonstrated.

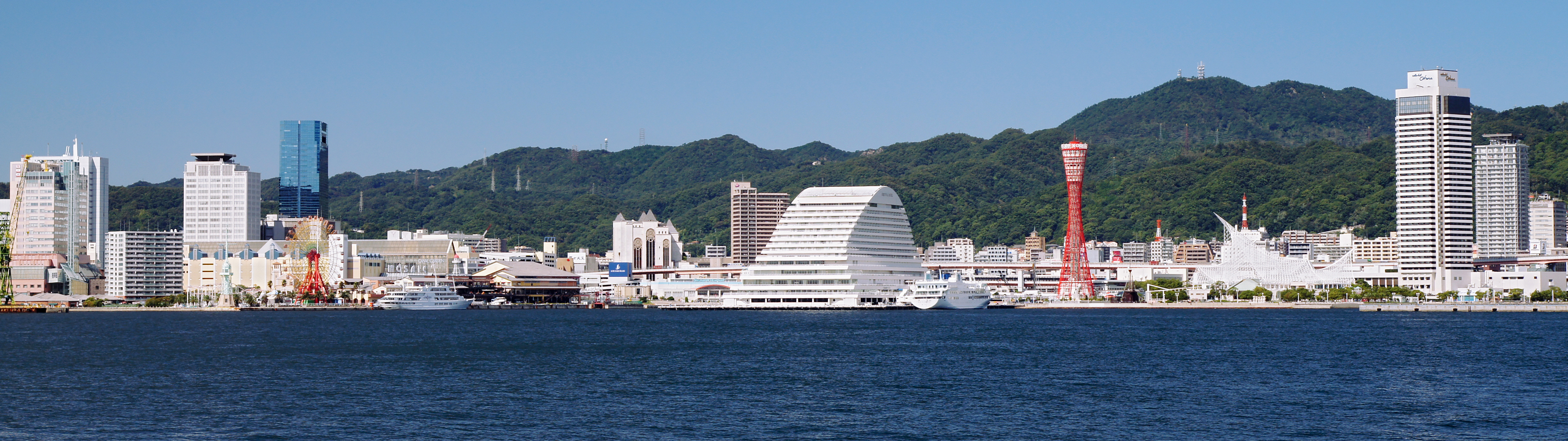
Nuclear-free Kobe Port, seen from Po-ai Shiosai Park in 2011

=== The Kobe Formula ===
The port of Kobe was used heavily by the U.S. fleet during its postwar occupation, which ended in 1974. Throughout the occupation, U.S. military facilities at Kobe Port were the target of continuous public protest. Public petitions after Kobe's return to Japan culminated in an 18 March 1975 resolution by the city council to prohibit nuclear-armed vessels from entering the port. Because U.S. policy is to neither confirm nor deny nuclear weapons deployment, this resolution effectively removed the U.S. naval presence from Kobe Port. Amid the presence of nuclear-powered U.S. vessels and concerns that the government allowed nuclear-armed warships into Japanese ports (which was later confirmed), this resolution became the first major application of the three non-nuclear principles. The strict policy has become known as the "Kobe Formula", and since its inception several thousand Japanese municipalities have adopted similar nuclear-free resolutions.

=== Review ===
In recent years Japanese policymakers have been increasingly public in calling the three non-nuclear principles into question. In October 1999, Deputy Vice Minister of Defense Shingo Nishimura proposed to the Diet (as stated in a previous interview) that, in light of the North Korean threat, serious debate on Japan's nuclearization should begin. Public furor immediately forced Nishimura to resign from the (Keizo) Obuchi Cabinet.

In May 2002 Deputy Chief Cabinet Secretary Shinzo Abe repeated the observation of Kishi that Article 9 did not preclude Japan from owning sufficiently small (strictly defensive) nuclear weapons, including ICBMs and atomic bombs. In June of that year, Chief Cabinet Secretary Yasuo Fukuda, in an off-the-record talk with reporters (for which he later took responsibility), remarked further that "circumstances and public opinion could require Japan to possess nuclear weapons". Despite being highly hypothetical, both comments provoked public outcry and a sit-in protest in Hiroshima followed Fukuda's remark. Shortly thereafter Fukuda amended his statement, specifying that Japan could not own ICBMs under Article 9.

Fukuda was not forced to resign; Prime Minister Junichiro Koizumi described his remarks as "simply an observation that any basic policy of a country can be reviewed" and insists that his government has no intention of reviewing the principles. Koizumi continues to reaffirm the principles in each of his addresses for the Hiroshima and Nagasaki Peace Memorial Ceremonies.

More fervent criticism of Japan's non-nuclear policy has come from a few well-known academics and writers, including Kyoto University professor Terumasa Nakanishi and literary critic Kazuya Fukuda (who penned the article "A nuclear declaration for Japan" for Voice magazine). The majority of writers and scholars, however, tend to support non-nuclearism.

Japan decided not to sign the UN treaty on the Prohibition of Nuclear Weapons, a binding agreement for negotiations for the total elimination of nuclear weapons.

On 18 December 2025, following deterioration of relations between Japan and China a month before, an unnamed official in the Prime Minister's office suggested that Japan should consider acquiring nuclear weapons. This resulted in a strong reaction from China's foreign ministry, who responded that it was a “serious issue that exposes the dangerous attempts by some in Japan to breach international law and possess nuclear weapons” and regarded that as a "signal of the resurgence of Japanese militarism". The Japanese government later clarified that Japan's non-nuclear weapons policy has not changed, but did not comment on the official's subsequent status. Conservatives in Japan has expressed similar support for nuclear weapons, including the Sankei Shimbun in its editorial. In January 2026, two Chinese think-tanks released subsequent reports and claimed that statements from Japanese officials on acquisition of nuclear weapons were "not isolated or personal views”.

== See also ==
- Japanese Peace Bell
- Three Non-Nuclear Principles
- Article 9 of the Constitution of Japan
- M-5 rocket
- Japanese nuclear weapon program
- Nuclear latency
- Nuclear umbrella
- New Zealand nuclear-free zone
