= Three Non-Nuclear Principles =

Parliamentary resolutions that have guided the Japanese no-nuclear policy

Japan's Three Non-Nuclear Principles (非核三原則, Hikaku San Gensoku) are a parliamentary resolution (never adopted into law) that have guided Japanese nuclear policy since their inception in the late 1960s, and reflect general public sentiment and national policy since the end of World War II.

The principles were outlined by Prime Minister Eisaku Satō in a speech to the House of Representatives in 1967 amid negotiations over the return of Okinawa from the United States. The Diet formally adopted the principles in 1971.

== History ==
After the atomic bombings of Hiroshima and Nagasaki, Japanese public sentiment grew firmly opposed to the presence of nuclear weapons on Japanese soil, or even in Japanese waters. During Eisaku Satō's first term as prime minister, this opposition became a major obstacle to his campaign pledge to end the U.S. occupation of Okinawa, returning the island to Japanese control. The U.S. military was thought to keep nuclear weapons on the island, though it did not confirm or deny such weapons, and Satō faced opposition to reacquisition unless the nuclear presence was removed. As a compromise, Satō appeased the United States by bringing Japan into the Nuclear Non-Proliferation Treaty (NPT) in exchange for a nuclear-free, Japan-controlled Okinawa.

In the years leading up to this agreement, Satō was forced to appease public concerns that his administration might favor a nuclear weapons program; to this end, he introduced the Three Non-Nuclear Principles in a December 11, 1967, address to the Diet. The principles stated that Japan “shall neither possess nor manufacture nuclear weapons, nor shall it permit their introduction into Japanese territory.

To lessen their restrictive effect on the military, in a speech the following February he placed the principles within the broader framework of his Four-Pillars Nuclear Policy.

The pillars, in mimicry of the three pillars of the NPT, were:

1. To promote the peaceful use of nuclear power,
2. To work toward global nuclear disarmament,
3. To rely on the extended U.S. nuclear deterrent
4. To support the Three Non-Nuclear Principles.

The fourth pillar left room for policy change in the future, calling for Japan to abide by the principles "under the circumstances where Japan's national security is guaranteed by the other three policies".

The Diet passed a resolution formally adopting the principles in 1971, though they were not made law. Eisaku Satō was presented with the Nobel Peace Prize in 1974, in large part for his work toward Japan's entry into the NPT. In his Nobel Lecture (on the seventh anniversary of his original statement to the Diet), Satō reiterated and discussed the Three Non-Nuclear Principles and expressed hope and confidence that future governments would adopt them as well.

=== Revision ===
Every Prime Minister of Japan since Satō has publicly reaffirmed the Three Non-Nuclear Principles. However, Japanese government-sponsored studies have been carried out in the past—and are suspected by some analsyts and activists to be ongoing—to assess the feasibility of developing a nuclear weapons program.

In recent years, public officials and nuclearization advocates have been unprecedentedly vocal in questioning the principles, but the government has remained committed to them.

== See also ==
- Japan's non-nuclear weapons policy
- Japanese nuclear weapon program
- Nuclear latency
- Nuclear umbrella
