= Harry C. Kelly =

Harry Charles Kelly (9 October 1908—2 February 1976) was an American physicist best known for his role in Japan in the aftermath of World War II in preserving scientific research not related to weaponry. He forged enduring relations between the U.S. and Japanese scientific communities, recognized by the Japanese government. Upon his death in 1976, the Japanese government requested a portion of his remains be buried in Japan. He is the subject of a biography, Science has No National Borders: Harry C. Kelly and the Reconstruction of Science and Technology in Postwar Japan, and a documentary broadcast on Japanese television.

== Early life and career ==
Kelly was the son of a blacksmith for a coal mine and grew up in Wilkes-Barre, Pennsylvania, with a brother and two sisters. He earned a B.S. in physics at Lehigh University, and a Ph.D. at Massachusetts Institute of Technology in 1936. He helped found Baird Associates, a medical engineering firm in Cambridge, Massachusetts, but experienced a traumatic incident in which he was unable to save his brother from drowning. He subsequently moved to Montana, accepting a position at Montana State University at Bozeman. In Montana he met and married Irene Andes, the daughter of a Montana homesteader; the couple had two sons, Henry and Thomas. Inspired by the goals of the transformed St. John's College, he moved to Annapolis, Maryland, and taught the first physics classes there. With the outbreak of World War II, he returned to MIT, where he became part of the Radiation Laboratory (the "Rad Lab"), which played a key role in developing a practical radar system. After the war Kelly prepared to return to academic life, but instead was recruited as part of the Allied Occupation of Japan, as a science adviser to General Douglas MacArthur. His job was to help the Occupation distinguish between military equipment and civilian university research facilities.

== Role in postwar Japanese science ==
On November 24, 1945 US soldiers descended on a physics laboratory run by Yoshi Nishina and used dynamite, crowbars and blowtorches to dismantle two operating cyclotrons and sank them in Tokyo Bay. The US National Academy of Sciences and the Association of Oak Ridge Scientists were horrified and insisted that the US Occupation forces find someone who could distinguish civilian science from military equipment. Kelly was chosen and assigned to the Scientific and Technical division of the Occupation's General Headquarters Economic and Scientific Section (ESS/ST), arriving in January 1946. According to one assessment of Kelly's time in Japan, “From 1946-1950 he waged an enlightened and generally successful fight to save Japanese science from mindless destruction at the hands of the Occupation bureaucracy.” Kelly is also credited with saving the distinguished nuclear scientist, Yoshio Nishina from a US Army purge of Japanese scientists. Asked to vet Nishina by US intelligence officers, Kelly took the file home and made the assessment that “He was an international scholar, respected all over the world. And he had spoken out against the war. I said it was against everyone’s interests to purge that man.” They developed a strong personal bond, likely helped by Nishina's command of English. Kelly learned only a few words of Japanese in his time there. He also argued for the continuation of the Physical and Chemical Research Institute (Riken) in Tokyo with a new focus on research that could help Japan rebuild its economy. Although there was a strong push to have it dismantled as a monopoly, Kelly persuaded the powers that be that it was a vital institution for the rehabilitation of Japan in the post-war era. Kelly also prevented censorship of Japanese scientific publications.

Kelly returned to the U.S. in 1950, taking a position at the Office of Naval Research in Chicago. In 1951 Alan Waterman, the first director of the National Science Foundation (NSF), appointed Kelly to become Assistant Director for Scientific Personnel and Education. There he helped start the NSF fellowship program and summer institutes for boosting the skills of science instructors. When the institutes were established he sent out a notice that it was the " ....Foundation's 'understanding' that no one would be barred from participating or unfavorably discriminated against because of race, color, or religion. The policy kept some institutions from applying for institute grants and caused others to be turned down." In 1961, he was appointed Chairman of the United States Delegation to the United States-Japan Committee on Scientific Cooperation. He later accepted the position of dean of the faculty at North Carolina State University and subsequently served as provost. Even out of government service, Kelly continued to play a strong role in forging strong ties between Japanese and U.S. scientists.

Kelly retired from his position at North Carolina State University in 1974 and died on 2 February 1976. Shortly after his death, he was honored with a memorial service in Japan by his scientific colleagues. A portion of his ashes are buried in Japan next to those of Yoshio Nishina in the Tama Cemetery, Tokyo.

== Honors ==
- Honorary member of the Physical Society of Japan.
- Order of the Sacred Treasure, Second Class, the highest honor the Japanese government awards foreigners.
- Subject of a TV documentary in Japan, ”Dr. Kelly’s Legacy,” February 11, 1986, Asahi Network, Tokyo
- Harry C. Kelly Memorial Fund at North Carolina State University for the Japan Center Program in Science and Technology
