= Hikosaka Tadayoshi =

Japanese nuclear physicist (1902–1989)

- 彦坂 忠義
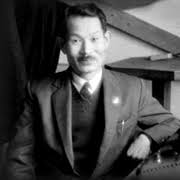

Personal details
- Born: December 25, 1902 Toyohashi, Empire of Japan
- Died: March 27, 1989 (aged 86) Sendai, Japan

Hikosaka Tadayoshi (Japanese: 彦坂 忠義; 1902–1989) was a Japanese nuclear physicist.

== Career ==
In 1923, Hikosaka enrolled at Tohoku Imperial University. He graduated in 1926 and thereafter served as a research assistant to Prof. Takahashi Yutaka (高橋 胖) of the university's Physics Department. In addition to Japanese, Hikosaka spoke fluent German.

In 1934, Hikosaka proposed a model of the internal structure of the atomic nucleus similar to what is now known as the shell model. Hikosaka's model was not accepted by the scientific community at the time because it contradicted the liquid-drop model being promoted in the 1930s by influential figures including Niels Bohr and John A. Wheeler. As a result, Physical Review refused to publish Hikosaka's papers in the United States and its editors dismissed him as an ignoramus. He later re-wrote his papers in German and published them in Japan. Hikosaka suggested that the energy released by nuclear fission could be used to create a new type of weapon.

Hikosaka's work represented one of the earliest attempts to describe the nucleus using a shell structure, decades before the modern nuclear shell model was established. The modern nuclear shell model was later developed in the late 1940s and early 1950s, especially through the work of Maria Goeppert-Mayer and J. Hans D. Jensen.

Their work explained the experimentally observed “magic numbers” of nuclear stability and received the 1963 Nobel Prize in Physics.

His work remains an example of a scientific idea that appeared before the experimental and theoretical environment was ready to fully accept it.

Hikosaka was an extremely serious and disciplined person. He would sit deeply in his chair, straighten his back, place both elbows on his knees, close his eyes and think. Hikosaka seemed to conduct all of his reasoning entirely inside his own mind.

In at the meeting of the Atomic Nuclear Physics Division of the Scientific Research Council in November 1944, Hikosaka gave an oral presentation which he claimed to have achieved fission using Uranium-238 in a fast-neutron reactor. That year, he submitted his thesis On a Method for the Utilization of Nuclear Energy (原子核エネルギー利用の一方法について) to Prof. Takahashi, but the papers were destroyed by an American air raid and he was not awarded a doctorate. Hikosaka then moved with his family to Dairen where he served as a professor at the Ryōjun Institute of Technology.

When Dairen was overrun by the Red Army at the end of the Soviet invasion of Manchuria, Hikosaka was taken prisoner by the Soviets and forced to continue teaching. During his internment, Hikosaka was approached by agents of the NKVD who attempted to entice him with gifts of candy to defect to the Soviet Union in order to assist the Soviet nuclear weapons program. Feeling depressed in the nihilistic atmosphere after Japan's surrender, Hikosaka seriously considered the offer but refused after the strong objections of his wife. After his refusal, the family's access to food was cut off and they nearly starved. Hikosaka's family was repatriated to Japan in 1949.

In 1950, Hikosaka submitted his thesis again and received a doctorate from Tohoku University. He later served as a professor at Iwate University, Niigata University, and Tohoku Gakuin University. Hikosaka theorized that the problem of slow neutrons being captured by the resonant absorption of Uranium-238 inside a nuclear reactor could be solved by making the reactor heterogeneous by arranging it in such a way that neutrons could be sufficiently slowed down in the moderator before entering the fuel rods.

Hikosaka retired in 1977. His eldest son is translator and social activist Tai Hikosaka whilst his fourth son is Masamichi Hikosaka, a physicist.

== See also ==
- Sagane Ryōkichi, the pioneer of nuclear power in Japan

== Bibliography ==
- 彦坂忠義追悼文集編集委員会, ed. (1991). Mokuren no hana - Hikosaka Tadayoshi tsuitō bunshū 木蓮の花 ～ 彦坂忠義追悼文集 (in Japanese) (1st ed.). Japan: Published privately.
