= Islamic Philosophy from its Origin to the Present =

2006 book by Seyyed Hossein Nasr

Islamic Philosophy from its Origin to the Present: Philosophy in the Land of Prophecy
- Author: Seyyed Hossein Nasr
- Language: English
- Series: SUNY series in Islam
- Subject: Islamic philosophical tradition
- Genre: History of philosophy; Islamic philosophy
- Publisher: State University of New York Press (SUNY Press)
- Publication date: 2006
- Publication place: United States
- Media type: Paperback; Hardcover
- Pages: 390
- ISBN: 978-0-7914-6800-5
- OCLC: 61295941
- Dewey Decimal: 181.07
- LC Class: B741.N384 2006
- Website: sunypress.edu

Islamic Philosophy from its Origin to the Present: Philosophy in the Land of Prophecy is a book by Seyyed Hossein Nasr, Iranian philosopher and University Professor of Islamic studies at George Washington University. The book is a history and overview of Islamic philosophy covering its origins in the 9th century to the modern era.

== Overview ==
The book presents a narrative of the development of philosophy in the Islamic world, and its relationship with revelation and holy matter. The author intended to present Islamic philosophy in the form of teachings, and discuss its development in the context of the wider history of the Islamic world, in particular its relationship with Islamic revelation.

The author focused on the later period of Islamic philosophy, especially in Iran. After the Mongol invasion, Iran became the most important arena for the continuation of Islamic thought. The author claims that during this time, Islamic philosophy became closer to the inner truths revealed through revelation. He also used this later period for comparative studies, comparing Islamic and Christian philosophical traditions and examining how they diverged and followed different destinies.

The book is the result of about fifty years of the author's study and reflection of philosophy and philosophical issues. In the introduction of the Persian translation of the book, the author Seyyed Hossein Nasr states that the book is an attempt to challenge the narratives of orientalists about Islamic thought, and he and Henry Corbin are among the researchers who have been trying to challenge the monologue of Western-minded orientalism.

== Synopsis ==
The book begins with the preface and transliteration sections, as well as the author's introduction. In the first part, the author presents a report on contemporary Western research on Islamic philosophy. It includes an explanation of the position of Islamic philosophy in the Islamic world, its relations with other domains and sciences, and the meaning of Islamic philosophy from the perspective of Muslim philosophers.

In the second part the author discusses the existence of the underlying content and skeletonization of Islamic philosophy. In particular, metaphysics in Islamic philosophy is discussed, including Martin Heidegger's opinion that returning to being is the way to salvation. Western philosophy talks about the end of metaphysics, but the current of Islamic philosophy is the convergence between ontology and metaphysics, as proposed in the philosophy of Mulla Sadra, based on the theory of the "Primacy of Existence".

The third part is the most detailed, presenting a framework for the study of Islamic philosophy through history, and dealing with Islamic philosophy from the beginning to the contemporary period.

In the fourth part, the author deals with the current state of thought in the Islamic world, examines the many relations between Islam and modern thought, and examines the flow of philosophy in the realm of prophecy in the past and present.

== Release and reception ==
The book was first published in English by the State University of New York's SUNY Press in the United States in 2006. It was translated into Persian by Mehdi Najafi Afra, professor of Islamic studies at Islamic Azad University in Tehran, and published by Jami in 2015 with an updated edition in 2017.

Academic reviews have been generally positive, commending its comprehensiveness and detail, particularly of Islamic philosophers and schools of thought that have remained obscure in Western discourse. One review commented that the material seems to have been compiled from essays written for other occasions, resulting in repetition, and described it as "an uneven work, usually beautifully written, but neither simple and organized enough for students nor deep enough for scholars." In 2007, the American Library Association recommended it for graduate level study in its Choice book review.

== See also ==
- Platonism in Islamic philosophy
- Sophie's World
- The Pragmatic Entente: Israeli–Iranian Relations, 1948–1988
- Not for the Faint of Heart: Lessons in Courage, Power and Persistence
- Foucault in Iran: Islamic Revolution after the Enlightenment
- Iran Between Two Revolutions
