= Bahram ibn Mardanshah =

Zoroastrian Priest

Bahram ibn Mardanshah was a Zoroastrian priest, who is notable for translating the important Sasanian-era historical chronicle of Khwaday-Namag from Middle Persian into Arabic. Not much is known about Bahram; he was from the town of Shapur in the southern Iranian region of Fars, and may have lived in the 8th or 9th century as he first appears in the account of the Persian historian Hamza al-Isfahani (died after 961).

== Sources ==
- Khatibi, Abolfazl; Negahban, Farzin (2013). "Bahrām b. Mardānshāh". In Madelung, Wilferd; Daftary, Farhad (eds.). Encyclopaedia Islamica Online. Brill Online. ISSN 1875-9831.
