= Hamza al-Isfahani =

10th-century Persian philologist and historian

- Born: c. 893; Isfahan, Jibal, Abbasid Caliphate
- Died: after 961
- Occupations: Philologist, historian

Ḥamza ibn al-Ḥasan ibn al-Mū'addib al-Iṣbahānī Abū ‘Abd Allāh (Arabic: حمزة بن الحسن المُؤَدِّب الأصفهاني ابو عبد الله; c. 893 – after 961), commonly known as Ḥamza al-Iṣfahānī or Hamza Esfahani (Persian: حمزه اصفهانی), was a Persian philologist and historian, who wrote in Arabic during the 'Abbasid and Buyid eras. He spent most of his life in his native town, Isfahan, and visited Baghdad at least three times during his lifetime. He had contact with many important scholars and historians, among them al-Tabari and Ibn Durayd. He wrote a history of Isfahan, a famous chronology of pre-Islamic and Islamic dynasties known as Taʾrīk̲h̲ sinī mulūk al-arḍ wa ’l-anbiyāʾ (تاریخ سنی ملوک الارض و الانبیا), and some other works on lexicography and poetry.

== Biography ==
Like many other medieval Iranian scholars, details regarding the life of Hamza are obscure. He was born in the city of Isfahan in c. 893, where he spent most of his life and was the son of a schoolmaster (mū’addib). The city had served as an important center in western Iran under the Achaemenid, Parthian and Sasanian Empire. During the 9th-century, many Zoroastrians and other adherents of non-Zoroastrian, Iranian faiths continued to reside in the city. During the late 9th-century or early 10th-century, the city started to gain a large Muslim community, which, nevertheless, preserved their ancient lore. Some scholars such as A.C.S. Peacock have theorized Hamza to possibly have been a secret Zoroastrian, but other scholars have disagreed with this statement.

Despite his keen interest in Iranian affairs and the pre-Islamic history of the country, Hamza preferred to write in Arabic, like the rest of the literary elite of Isfahan. (Note: Persian first increasingly became the preferred literary language of Isfahan starting from the late 11th-century.) The city seemingly served as a major hub for the collection and transmission of the numerous modifications of the Middle Persian history text Khwaday-Namag (Book of Kings). Hamza made much use of the work, as demonstrated in his Sini Muluk al-ard w'al-anbiya. Not many scholars in Isfahan were familiar with Middle Persian, and it is uncertain if Hamza himself had any knowledge of it. Hamza was seemingly a distinguished citizen of Isfahan, due to his broad knowledge, which also earned him opponents, who referred him to as "drivel merchant." In his work, Hamza immediately puts emphasis on the importance of Iran at the center of the world, a common trend in the historiography of the period as also seen in the works of al-Tabari and Abu Hanifa Dinawari.

== Bibliography ==
=== Extant works ===
- Tā’rīkh sinī mulūk al-arḍ wa’l-anbiyā’
- al-Durra al-fākhira fī’l-amthāl al-sāʼira
- Sawāʼir al-amthāl ʻalá af’al
- al-Amthāl al-ṣādira ‘an buyūt al-shi’r
- Dīwān ‘Abī Nuwās
- al-Tanbīh ʻalá ḥudūth al-taṣhīf

=== Partially extant works ===
- al-Muwāzana bayn al-‘arabī wa’l-fārsīya (also titled al-Muwāzana bayn al-‘arabī wa’l-‘ajami)

=== Lost works ===
- Tā’rīkh Iṣbahān
- Iṣbahan wa-‘akhbāruha
- Kitāb al-tashbīhāt
- ‘Anwā’i al-du’ā’
- Kitāb rasā’il
- al-Atamāthīl fī tabāshīr al-surūr
- Kitāb jama’ feyh ‘akhbār ‘esharat min al-shu’arā’ al-muhdithuīn ‘awaluhum Bashār
- Dīwān sh’ar ‘Abi Tamām
- Maḍāhik al-‘ash’ār
- A’yād al-furs (also titled A’yād Baghdād al-furs)
- Risāla al-ash’ār al-sā’ira fī ‘l-nayrūz wa’l-mihradjān

=== Other works ===
Hamza also edited a recension of the Kitāb Naqd al-Shi’r (Book on Poetic Criticism) by Qudāma ibn Ja’far, but he only added chapter divisions.

=== Published editions and translations ===
- Tā’rīkh sinī mulūk al-arḍ wa’l-anbiyā
  - Schultens, Albert (1786). Historia imperii vetustissimi Joctanidarum in Arabia felice. Harderwijk: Ioannem van Kasteel. pp. 18–45. (Chapter 8 in Arabic and Latin)
  - Rasmussen, Jens Lassen (1817). Historia praecipuorum Arabum regnorum rerumque ab iis gestarum ante Islamismum: e codicibus manuscriptis Arabicis. Copenhagen: J.F. Schultz. (Chapters 6–7, 9, and first two parts of chapter 10 in Arabic and Latin)
  - Gottwaldt, J.M.E. (1836). Hamsae Ispahanensis annalium caput quartum. Wrocław: n.p. (Chapter 4 in Arabic and Latin)
  - Gottwaldt, J.M.E. (1844–1848). Hamzae Ispahanensis annalium libri X. 2 vols. Saint Petersburg & Leipzig: Leopold Voss. (in Arabic and Latin). – 2nd ed. (1922). Berlin: Kawiani.
  - Aḥmad, Mawlawī Kabīr al-Dīn (1866). Tārīkh mulūk al-ard. Kolkata: Mazhar al-Ajaib. (in Arabic)
  - Daudpota, U.M. (1932). “The Annals of Ḥamzah al-Iṣfahānī". The Journal of the K.R. Cama Oriental Institute. 21–24: 58–120. (Chapter 1 in English)
  - (1961). Tā’rīkh sinī mulūk al-arḍ wa’l-anbiyā’. Beirut: Dar Maktabat al-Hayah. (in Arabic)
  - Sha’ār, Ja'far (1967). Tārikh-i payāmbarān va šāhān. Tehran: Bonyād-i Farhang-i Irān. (in Persian) – 2nd ed. (1989). Tehran: Amir Kabir.
  - Adang, Camilla (2006). “The Chronology of the Israelites according to Ḥamza al-Iṣfahānī.” Jerusalem Studies in Arabic and Islam 32: 286–310. (Chapter 5 in English)
  - al-Tibrizī, Jawād (2017). Tā’rīkh sinī mulūk al-arḍ wa’l-anbiyā’. Beirut: Dar al-Warrak. (in Arabic)
  - Hoyland, Robert G. (2018). The 'History of the Kings of the Persians' in Three Arabic Chronicles: The Transmission of the Iranian Past from Late Antiquity to Early Islam. Liverpool: Liverpool University Press. pp. 26–78. (Chapter 1 in English)

== Sources ==
- Canepa, Matthew (2018). "Hamza al-Isfahani". In Nicholson, Oliver (ed.). The Oxford Dictionary of Late Antiquity. Oxford: Oxford University Press. ISBN 978-0-19-866277-8.
- Daniel, Elton L. (1998). "Ḥamza al-Iṣfahānī". In Daniel, E. L.; Meisami, J. S. (eds). Encyclopedia of Arabic Literature. Volume 1. London: Routledge. pp. 270-271.
- Danner, Victor (1975). "Arabic Literature in Iran". In Frye, Richard N. (ed.). The Cambridge History of Iran: From the Arab Invasion to the Saljuqs. Vol. 4. Cambridge: Cambridge University Press. pp. 566–595. ISBN 0-521-20093-8.
- Herzig, Edmund; Stewart, Sarah (2011). Early Islamic Iran. I. B. Tauris. ISBN 978-1780760612.
- Kamaly, Hossein (2006). "Isfahan vi. Medieval period". In Yarshater, Ehsan (ed.). Encyclopædia Iranica. Vol. XIII/6: Iraq V. Safavid period–Isfahan VIII. Qajar period. London and New York: Routledge & Kegan Paul. pp. 641–650. ISBN 978-0-933273-94-8.
- Mittwoch, Eugen (1909). "Die literarische Tätigkeit Ḥamza al-Iṣbahānīs: ein Beitrag zur älteren arabischen Literaturgeschichte". Mitteilungen des Seminars für Orientalische Sprachen an der Königlichen Friedrich-Wilhelms-Universität zu Berlin, Zweite Abteilung: Westasiatische Studien. 12: 109-169.
- Pourshariati, Parvaneh (2007). "Hamza al-Isfahani and Sasanid Historical Geography of Sini Muluk al-ard w'al-anbiya". In Gyselen, Rika (ed.). Des Indo-Grecs aux Sassanides: données pour l'histoire et la géographie historique. Peeters Publishers. pp. 111–140.
- Rosenthal, F. (1971). "Ḥamza al-Iṣfahānī". In Lewis, B.; Ménage, V. L.; Pellat, Ch. & Schacht, J. (eds.). The Encyclopaedia of Islam, Second Edition. Volume III: H–Iram. Leiden: E. J. Brill. p. 156. OCLC 495469525.
- Sherrill, Logan J. (2024). The World of Ḥamza al-Iṣfahānī: His Life and Writings in Context (PDF) (Thesis). University of North Carolina at Greensboro.
- Zychowicz-Coghill, Edward (2022). "Remembering the Ancient Iranian City from Late Antiquity to Islam: Hamza al-Isfahani and the Sasanian Book of Kings". In Jiménez, Javier Martínez; Ottewill-Soulsby, Sam (eds.). Remembering and Forgetting the Ancient City. Oxbow Books. pp. 247–274. ISBN 9781789258165.
