= Evan Siegel =

- Born: 1954 (age 71–72); USA?
- Occupation: Academic
- Website: https://www.webcitation.org/5knmBqtQo?url=http://www.geocities.com/evan_j_siegel/

Evan Siegel is a professor of Mathematics and Computer Science.

== Biography ==
Evan Siegel received his PhD in Mathematics from the CUNY Graduate Center in 2000, his MSc in Mathematics from New York University, and his BSc in Mathematics from MIT. He is currently an Associate Professor of Mathematics at New Jersey City University. In addition to his interest in Mathematics, Siegel is interested in the history of the Middle East and has numerous publications on this topic. Siegel does research in sources in Persian, French, Arabic, Turkish, Russian, German, and Georgian.

In 1998-2000 he was an Editorial Board Member of the Journal of Azerbaijani Studies, and in 1994-2002 a Corresponding Secretary of the International Society for Azerbaijani Studies.

== Books ==
- An annotated translation of Ahmad Kasravi's History of the Iranian Constitutional Revolution. (2007)
- "Akinchi and Azerbaijani Self-Definition" in Michael Ursinus, Christoph Herzog, & Raoul Motika (ed.), Heidelberger Studien zur Geschichte und Kultur des modernen Vorderen Orients, vol. 27 (Frankfurt am Main, etc.: Peter Lang, 2001)
- "An Azerbaijani Poets' Duel over Iranian Constitutionalism" in Michael Ursinus, Raoul Motika, & Christoph Herzog (eds.), Presse und Öffentlichkeit im Nahen Östen (Istanbul: ISIS Yayinlari, 2000)
- "The Politics of Shahid-e Javid" in Werner Ende and Rainer Brunner (eds.), The Twelver Shia in Modern Times: Religious Culture and Political History (Leiden: Brill (Social, Economic and Political Studies of the Middle East, vol. 72), 2000)
- "Negahiye Kutahi be Bargozidehayi az Mollah Nasr od-Din/Montakhebiye az Nashriyeye Molla Nasr od-Din" in Janet Afary et al., Negareshi bar Zan va Jensiat dar Dawran-e Mashrute (Chicago: Historical Society of Iranian Women, 2000)
- "The Turkish Language in Iran by Ahmad Kasravi" (translated from Arabic), Journal of Azerbaijani Studies (vol. 1, no. 2, 1998)
- "A Woman's Letters to Molla Nasr od-Din(Tbilisi)" in Christopher Herzog et al. (eds.), Presse und Öffentlichkeit im Nahen Östen (Heidelberg: Heidelberg Orientverlag, 1995)
- "Chand Maqale az Mulla Nasr ud-Din", Nimeye Digar no. 17 (Winter 1993)

== Articles, papers, etc ==
- "A risala by Sheikh Fazlollah Nuri denouncing the Iranian constitutional movement," Images, Representations and Perceptions in the Shia World, Geneva, Switzerland, (2002)
- "Debates in Georgian Historiography on the Iranian Constitutional Revolution", Society for Iranian Studies Conference (2001)
- "The Uses of Classical Iranian Literature in Early Modern Azerbaijani Satire", International Conference on "The Middle Eastern Press as a Forum for Literature, Bamberg, Germany (October 2001)
- "Negahiye Kutahi be Bargozidehayi az Mollah Nasr od-Din/Montakhebiye az Nashriyeye Molla Nasr od-Din" in Janet Afary et al., Negareshi bar Zan va Jensiat dar Dawran-e Mashrute (Chicago: Historical Society of Iranian Women, 2000)
- "The Mullah and the Commissar: Mirza Jalil Muhammadquluzada in the Land of the Soviets", Middle East Studies Association (2000)
- "Soviet Georgian Historiography of the Iranian Constitutional Revolution", Society for Iranian Studies Conference (2000)
- "A Debate on Women and the Shariat, Baku 1907", Middle East Studies Association (1999)
- "Some Aspects of the Shahid-e Javid Debate in Iran", Die Zwölfershia in der Neuzeit, Freiburg, October 1999
- "Armenophilia among the Azerbaijani Intelligentsia", Association for the Study of Nationalities (1999)
- "Shahid-e Javid as an Alternate Huseynology", Middle East Studies Association (1998)
- "Azerbaijani Identity in the first Caucasian Muslim Press: The Case of Ekinchi", Die Anfänge der Press im Nahen Östen, Aachen, October 1998
- "The Turkish Language in Iran by Ahmad Kasravi" (translated from Arabic), Journal of Azerbaijani Studies (vol. 1, no. 2, 1998)
- "Iranian Historical Survival", An Evening of Persian Literature, Music, and Poetry (hosted by Encyclopædia Iranica) (Naw Ruz, 1997)
- "Taza Hayat (Baku) and the Iranian Constitutionalist Revolution", Middle East Studies Association (1997)
- "Taza Hayat between Ottoman Pan-Islam and Iran", Iran and the Ottoman Empire (Germany, 1997)
- "Ahmad Kasravi: From Nationalism to Internationalism", L'Association Française pour l'Étude du Monde Arabe et Musulman (France, 1996) OCLC 34404711
- "Ahmad Kasravi and the 1946 Azerbaijan Autonomous Government", Middle East Studies Association (1996)
- "Women's Letters to the Editor in Mulla Nasr ud-Din", Newspaper and Public Opinion in the Islamic World Seminar (Germany, 1996)
- "Ahmad Kasravi between Iranism and Azerbaijanism," Middle East Studies Association (1995) [Link in Persian]
- "Mulla Nasr ud-Din and the Iranian Constitutionalist Revolution", Baku International Symposium (Republic of Azerbaijan, 1995)
- "Mulla Nasr ud-Din's Impact on the Iranian Constitutionalist Press", Middle East Studies Association (1994)
- "Mulla Nasr ud-Din and Sattar Khan's Uprising", Middle East Studies Association (1993)
- "Mulla Nasr ud-Din and the Iranian Constitutionalist Revolution, 1906-1907", Middle East Studies Association (1992)
- "Mulla Nasr ud-Din and the Iranian Constitutionalist Revolution, 1906-1907", Baku, Azerbaijan
- "A Palestinian View of the Iranian Revolution", Middle East Studies Association (1990)
- "Mehdi Hashemi and the Iranian Revolution", Middle East Studies Association (1998)
- "A Palestinian View of the Iranian Revolution", Center for Iranian Research and Analysis (1987)
