= The Comprehensive History of Iran =

Farsi book about Iranian history

- Author: Group of Authors
- Original title: تاریخ جامع ایران
- Language: Persian
- Series: 20 Volumes
- Subject: History of Iran
- Genre: Reference, Official history, Academic history
- Publisher: Encyclopaedia Islamica
- Publication date: 2014
- Publication place: Iran
- Media type: Print
- Pages: 840 (Vol. 1)
- ISBN: 978-600-6326-37-5
- Website: choi.ir

The Comprehensive History of Iran (Persian: تاریخ جامع ایران) is a twenty-volume book series about various aspects of Iran's political, social and cultural history from pre-Islamic times to the extinction of the Qajar dynasty. The research, compilation and writing of this multi-volume book has lasted for 14 years. The first five volumes of this series narrate the period of ancient Iran and the other 15 volumes narrate the history of Iran in the Islamic period, political, social, cultural, scientific, literary and artistic history. One hundred and seventy foreign and domestic authors have been used to write this multi-volume book.

== Formation and release ==
The book The Comprehensive History of Iran has been prepared for fourteen years by more than 170 researchers, under the supervision of Kazem Mousavi-Bojnourdi and under the auspices of the Encyclopaedia Islamica Foundation.

Ten volumes of this book were unveiled in 2014 and its complete collection released on June 16, 2015 in the presence of a group of thinkers and local officials, including Ali Jannati, then Minister of Culture and Islamic Guidance of Iran, and Akbar Hashemi Rafsanjani, Chairman of Expediency Discernment Council, at the Encyclopaedia Islamica Center.

== Cooperators ==
A total of 167 people have collaborated in preparing this twenty-volume book. Their names and responsibilities are listed below:

=== Supervisions ===
Sources:

- Kazem Mousavi-Bojnourdi

=== Consultants ===
Sources:

- Iraj Afshar
- Sharaf al-Din Khorasani
- Enayatollah Reza
- Javad Tabatabai
- Fathollah Mojtabaei

=== Editors ===
==== The Ancient Iran section ====
Sources:

- Hassan Rezayi Baqbidi
- Mahmoud Jafari Dehaqi

==== The Islamic Period section ====
Sources:

- Mohammad Sadegh Sajjadi

=== Authors ===
==== Pre-Islamic section ====
- Massoud Azarnoush
- Jaleh Amouzgar
- Siamak Adhami
- Abolghasem Esmaeelpour
- Mohammad Taghi Imanpour
- Habib Borjian
- Askar Bahrami Kahyashnezhad
- Taghi Binesh
- Antonio Panaino
- Shima Jafari Dehaqi
- Mahmoud Jafari Dehaqi
- Masoud Jalali Moghadam
- Carlo Cereti
- Mansour Seyyed Sajjadi
- Mansour Shaki
- John Sheldon
- Rouhollah Shirazi
- Adel Shirali
- Hassan Talaei Moghanjooqi
- Hassan Fazeli Nesheli
- Mehrdad Fakour
- Bahman Firouzmandi
- Mehrdad Ghodrat Dizaji
- Badr al-Zamān Qarīb
- Pier Francesco Caliri
- Mathew Comperti
- Hassan Karimian
- Mohammadreza Chitsaz
- Morteza Hesari
- Margaret Khachikian
- Abolfazl Khatibi
- Nazanin Khalilipoor
- Touraj Daryaee
- Mohammad Taghi Rashed Mohassel
- Shahrokh Razmjou
- Enayatollah Reza
- Hassan Rezayi Baqbidi
- Jalal al-Din Rafiefar
- Zohreh Zarshenas
- Rouzbeh Zarrinkoub
- Philip G. Kreyenbroek
- Giovinazzo Grazia
- Rika Gyselen
- Yusef Majidzadeh
- Katayun Mazdapour
- Leyla Makvandi
- Mehrdad Malekzadeh
- Ali Mousavi
- Mohammad Mousavi
- Changiz Molayi
- Mahshid Mirfakhrayi
- Tomaso Newley
- Fereydoon Vahman
- Josef Wiesehöfer

==== Islamic Period section ====
- Abdolhossein Azarang
- Victoria Arakelova
- Yaghoub Azhand
- Seyyed Ali Ale Davoud
- Kheir Al-Nesa Alan
- Azar Ahanchi
- Mohammad Sadegh Ayatollahi
- Mansoureh Ettehadieh
- Hoorivash Ahmadi Dastgerdi
- Hooman As'adi
- Rüdiger Schmitt
- Fariba Eftekhar
- Iraj Afshar
- Mehran Afshari
- Sekandar Amanolahi Baharvand
- Mahmoud Omidsalar
- Mohsen Amini
- Paola Orsatti
- Ali Boloukbashi
- Clifford Edmund Bosworth
- Ali Bahramian
- Kaveh Bayat
- Ahmad Pakatchi
- Naser al-Din Parvin
- Sirous Parham
- John Parry
- Manouchehr Pezeshk
- Hossein Poornaderi
- Nasrollah Pourjavady
- Bita Pouravesh
- Anja Pistor Hatam
- Masoud Tazeh
- Mohammadali Tahvili
- Jamal Torabi Tabatabai
- Abdolghader Jafari
- Mohammad Jafari Qanavati
- Yadollah Jalali Pandari
- Hamideh Jamali
- Mohammadreza Chitsaz
- Masoud Habibi Mazaheri
- Esmaeel Hassanzadeh
- Hossein Heyran Moghadam
- Jalal Khaleghi Motlagh
- Babak Khezraei
- Ali Asghar Dadbeh
- Hamidreza Dalvand
- Farhad Daftary
- Ali Akbar Dianat
- Mohammad Raqeb
- Manizheh Rabiei
- Hashem Rajabzadeh
- Rowshan Rahmani
- Yusef Rahimlou
- Behzad Rahimian
- Morteza Razmara
- Enayatollah Reza
- Hassan Rezayi Baqbidi
- Hossein Rouhollahi
- Zohreh Roohfar
- Patrick Ringgenberg
- Tahmoures Sajedi Saba
- George Sanikidze
- Mohammad Sadegh Sajjadi
- Hossein Soltanzadeh
- Mina Salimi
- Mohammad Hasan Semsar
- Alireza Seyyed Taghavi
- Mehdi Seyyedi
- Mozaffar Shahedi
- Mohammad Sharaf Alam
- Esmaeel Shams
- Yahya Shahidi
- Hossein Shiban
- Emad al-Din Sheikh al-Hokamayi
- Adel Shirali
- Arman Shishegar
- Amenon Shiloa
- Ali Ashraf Sadeghi
- Javad Tabatabai
- Osman G. Özgüdenlı
- Yadollah Qolami
- Enayatollah Fatehinezhad
- Sasan Fatemi
- Willem Floor
- Javad Firoozi
- Hanif Qalandari
- Yunos Keramati
- Hamidreza Karamipour
- Asghar Karimi
- Linda Komaroff
- Masoud Kouhestaninezhad
- Mehdi Keyvani
- Saghi Gazerani
- Fatemeh Lajevardi
- Vanessa Martin
- Peyman Matin
- Fathollah Mojtabaei
- Enayatollah Majidi
- Ehsan Mos'hefi
- Mirza Mollamohammad
- Mohammadali Movahed
- Seyyed Hossein Meisami
- Ali Miransari
- Mir babayof
- Negin Miri
- Mohammadreza Naji
- Mohammad Nayebpour
- Abdul Manan Nasiruddin Of
- Nooshindokht Nafisi
- Sajjad Nikfahm Khoobravan
- Mohammad Bagher Vosooqi
- Mansoureh Vasiq
- Shahram Yusefifar

== Volumes ==
This twenty volumes book is the largest book described in the history of Iran and its first five volumes are dedicated to the history of pre-Islamic Iran and the next fifteen volumes are dedicated to the history of post-Islamic Iran. The book was originally scheduled to be published in fourteen volumes, which was later expanded to twenty volumes. This 20-volume book contains more than 55 main titles, 160 sub-titles and about 300 more sub-titles. The topics covered in each volume are as follows:

=== Volume One ===
History of ancient man on the Iranian Plateau and pre-Aryan civilizations; Aryan arrival in Iran, the Medes era and part of the political history of the Achaemenid Empire.

=== Volume Two ===
Continuation of Achaemenid history to the Seleucid Empire era, scattered governments or sectarian monarchies, the Sasanian Empire era, and finally the mythological history of Iran is examined in this volume.

=== Volume Three ===
Economic and social history of Iran from the beginning to the end of the Sassanid period; Administrative and military organizations in Iran; And finally, Iranian archeology and art during the reigns of the Medes and the Achaemenids.

=== Volume Four ===
Research in pre-Islamic Iranian art and architecture; Religions and education in Iran.

=== Volume Five ===
Research in Iranian language and literature, historiography, geography, philosophy and other sciences.

=== Volume Six ===
History of Iran from Islamic Conquest to appearance of Semi-Independent and Independent Governments; Topics such as the conquest of Iran and the last days of the Sassanid government; Iran in the era of Arab ethnic rule, Iranians and the rise of the Abbasid state; Iranian Ministry and Bureaucracy and part of the Eastern and Western governments of the Islamic era.

=== Volume Seven ===
History of Iranian states in Khorasan, northern Iran, central and western and southern Iran from Tahirid dynasty to Kakuyids and the history of their administrative and political organization.

=== Volume Eight ===
The Buyid dynasty, Ghaznavids, and Iranian traces in the Seljuq dynasty era and some smaller dynasties in western Iran, such as the Bani Sekman in Armenia and the Karabakh monarchs.

=== Volume Nine ===
History of Iran from Atabakan to part of the Ilkhanate; In this section, the period of dynasties called Atabakan, from Atabakan of Azerbaijan to Injuian; Areas of Mongols Invasion; Genghis Khan's successors, the establishment of the Ilkhanate government, are discussed, and the political-administrative organizations of these periods are studied.

=== Volume Ten ===
Trail of the Ilkhanate until the rise of the Safavid dynasty; In addition to the second period of the Ilkhanate to the Turkmens era and the important period of the Timurid Empire and part of the Safavids.

=== Volume Eleven ===
Continuation of Safavid era, the periods of Afsharid dynasty and Zand dynasty reign.

=== Volume Twelve ===
The Qajar era, religious developments, Iran's foreign relations with the Ottoman Empire and powerful European states, the context of the uprising Constitutional monarchy revolution, the role of social classes in political and social developments, the arrival of a new civilization in Iran and many other issues are also discussed. In the appendices of this volume, the Khanates of Central Asia, the Khanates of Ganjeh and Sheki and Qarabagh, Hormuz and the Persian Gulf have been studied.

=== Volumes Thirteen and Fourteen ===
History of Science and Literature; Contains topics such as the role of Iranians in translating scientific works into Arabic language, the era of composing scientific works, philosophical and theological sciences in Iran and among Iranians, astronomy and mathematics, natural sciences and medicine, hospitals, religious sciences and jurisprudential religions, Sufism and its sects, historiography and a few other topics.

=== Volumes Fifteen to Seventeen ===
It includes the history of Persian language and literature from the beginning of the Islamic era to the end of the Qajar era. In this volume, Persian literature in the cultural realm of Iran is discussed according to literary periods. The period of literary return, constitutional literature, popular literature, newspapers and journalism, literature of Iranian ethnic groups, history of education and many others are among the chapters of these volumes.

=== Volumes Eighteen and Nineteen ===
For the history of Iranian art and Iranian architecture, it includes handicrafts, decorative arts, plays, rituals, music and architecture.

=== Volume Twenty ===
It is dedicated to the topics of social history, legal system in Iran, religions and sects in Iran, social classes and public life.

== Critique ==
There have been some criticisms for The Comprehensive History of Iran book series, including: Some chapters of ancient Iran (pre-Islam section), such as the history of the Medes, have nothing new to say and are merely interpretations of Persian translations of the works of earlier orientalists. The method of references used in the first five volumes is different from the next fifteen volumes and is unusual and has no special logic. It does not uniformly present the true meaning of history. Some parts of the book are copied and duplicated from the book Encyclopedia of Iran from the same publisher. The inadequacy of some sections is astounding. Some sections are not written by historians and are a kind of political interpretation based on specific texts. In some cases the writers are outstanding or the best in their field, in some cases they are mediocre and in some cases they are weak. Lack of serious study of the history of Iran in the twentieth century, especially the Pahlavi era and the Islamic Revolution and performance of Government of the Islamic Republic of Iran. The way the book was presented was very promotional. This book has been prepared with great haste. This book is just a chronicle, without regard to new information and references to a large volume of new books and research. The articles do not have the right ending and conclusions. The book's editing is incomplete and some of the reviews have been personalized.

== See also ==
- The Cambridge History of Iran
- Encyclopædia Iranica
- Encyclopaedia Islamica
- Iran Between Two Revolutions
- Foucault in Iran
