= John Carlin (journalist) =

British journalist and author

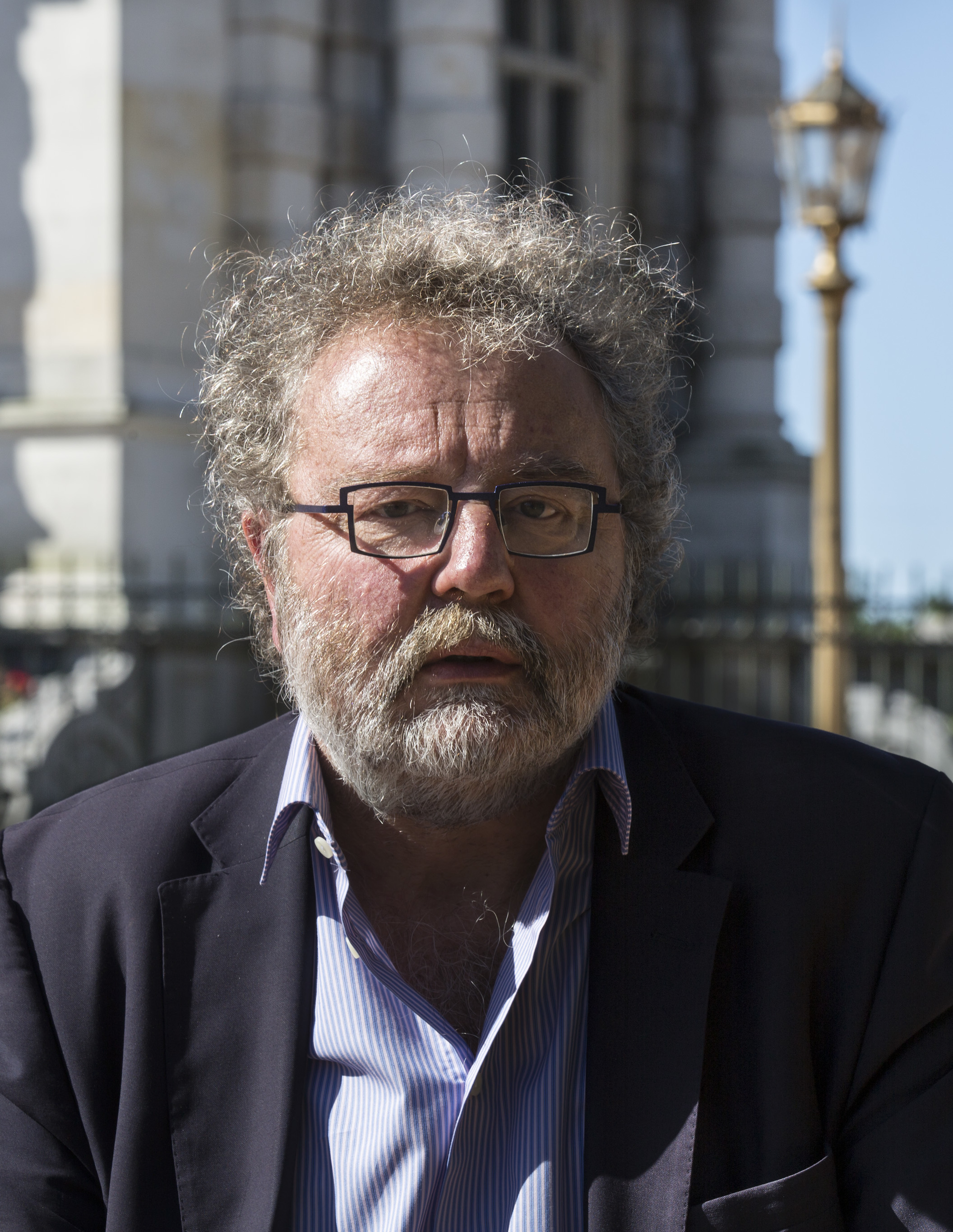
- John Carlin in 2016
- Born: 12 May 1956 (age 69) London, United Kingdom
- Occupation: Journalist, writer
- Genre: Journalism, sports, non-fiction

John Carlin (born 12 May 1956) is a British journalist and author, who deals with both sports and politics. His book Playing the Enemy: Nelson Mandela and the Game that Made a Nation, about former South African president Nelson Mandela, is the basis for the 2009 film Invictus.

== Personal life ==
Carlin was born to a Scottish father and Spanish mother. He spent the first three years of his life in North London, before moving to Buenos Aires, Argentina, due to his father's posting to the British Embassy.

After returning to England, he was educated at St George's College, Weybridge, and went on to earn an MA in English Language and Literature from Oxford University. He has one child.

== Career ==
Carlin began his journalism career at the Buenos Aires Herald in 1981, writing about film, football and politics. In 1982, he began a six-year stint in Mexico and Central America working for, among others, The Times and Sunday Times, the Toronto Star, BBC, CBC, and ABC News before joining the staff of The Independent at the newspaper's launch in 1986.

Carlin was The Independent's South Africa bureau chief from 1989 to 1995. In 1993, Carlin wrote and presented a BBC documentary on the South African Third Force, his first television work.

From 1995 to 1998 he was the United States bureau chief for The Independent on Sunday.

In 1997, Carlin wrote an article titled "A Farewell to Arms" for Wired magazine about cyberwarfare. This was originally intended to form the basis of a 1999 film, WW3.com. When this project stalled, its script was rewritten into the 2007 film, Live Free or Die Hard (Die Hard 4.0).

In 1998, Carlin joined El País, the world's leading Spanish-language newspaper, where he worked as a senior international writer until being sacked in October 2017 after an article highly critical of the Spanish government and King regarding the Catalonian independence referendum. He has since written regularly for La Vanguardia. He also writes regularly for Argentine newspaper Clarín.

Carlin was writer and interviewer for the 1999 episode "The Long Walk of Nelson Mandela" of the American PBS series Frontline. It was also broadcast as "The First Accused" in South Africa by the SABC.

=== Awards ===
Carlin won the 2000 Spanish Ortega y Gasset Award for journalism, for an article in Spanish newspaper El País. In 2004 he won the British Press Awards "Food and Drink Writer of the Year" prize. He has won numerous other awards for his writing in Spain and Italy.

== Nelson Mandela ==
Much of Carlin's career has dealt with the politics of South Africa.

In a 1998 interview, Mandela said of Carlin's journalism: "What you wrote and the way in which you carried out your task in this country was absolutely magnificent…it was absolutely inspiring. You have been very courageous, saying things which many journalists would never say." Mandela wrote the foreword to Carlin's 2004 Spanish language book, Heroica Tierra Cruel, about Africa.

In August 2008, Carlin published the book Playing the Enemy: Nelson Mandela and the Game that Made a Nation, about how Mandela used the 1995 Rugby World Cup to reconcile a nation driven by centuries of racial animosity. The book became the basis for Clint Eastwood's 2009 film, Invictus, starring Morgan Freeman as Mandela.

Carlin has written for, among others, The Times, the Financial Times, the New York Times, Wall Street Journal, The Observer, the Guardian, the New Statesman, Wired and New Republic.

== Other works ==
In August 2011, Carlin collaborated with tennis superstar Rafael Nadal on the latter's autobiography Rafa (Hyperion, 2012, ISBN 1401310923).

== Filmography ==
- War on Peace (Documentary, BBC) (1993) (Writer/Interviewer)
- The Long Walk of Nelson Mandela (Documentary) PBS Frontline (1999) (Writer/Cast)
- Live Free or Die Hard (2007) (Script/Article)
- Invictus (2009) (Book)
- The 16th Man (Documentary, ESPN) (2010) (Writer/Producer)
- This is Football (Documentary series, Amazon Prime) (2019) (Executive Producer)

== Bibliography ==
- Chase Your Shadow: The Trials of Oscar Pistorius, Atlantic Books (UK), ISBN 9781782393269, 2014
- Rafa, Hyperion (US), ISBN 1401310923 and Little Brown (UK), ISBN 1847445144, August 2011
- Playing the Enemy: Nelson Mandela and the Game that Made a Nation, ISBN 978-1-59420-174-5, Penguin, August 2008
- Heroica Tierra Cruel ISBN 978-84-322-0882-9, September 2004 (in Spanish)
- White Angels: Beckham, Real Madrid and the New Football, ISBN 978-0-7475-7345-6, Bloomsbury, September 2004

== Comics ==
- Mandela and the General, Plough Publishing House (US), ISBN 978-0874868203, November 2018 (Writer, with art by Oriol Malet)
