= Khwaday-Namag =

Middle Persian historical text

Khwadāy-Nāmag (Iranian Persian: خدای‌نامه Khodây-Nâmeh/Xodây-Nâmeh; (Note: Khodāy-Nāme per modern Iranian Persian pronunciation.) lit. 'Book of Lords/Kings') is the hypothetical title (Note: Michael R. J. Bonner writes that, while it is common practice to refer to the text as the Khudāy-Nāma or its hypothetical Middle Persian equivalent Khvatāy-Nāmak, this should be avoided since the original Middle Persian text and its title are lost. He uses the phrase "Khudāy-Nāma tradition" instead.) of a lost Middle Persian story from the Sasanian era. It presumably encompassed the national history of Iran from the beginning of time until the Sasanian period. It was a remote predecessor of Ferdowsi's Shahnameh ('Book of Kings'), the 10th-century Iranian national epic, which, it is assumed, drew from a version or versions of the Khwaday-Namag. Scholars have tried to determine the content of the Khwaday-Namag through a comparison of Zoroastrian works, Islamic sources, and Ferdowsi's Shahnameh. Some scholars use the term Khwaday-Namag to refer to a tradition or genre of texts dealing with Sasanian or Iranian national history, rather than to refer to a single putative original text.

According to Theodor Nöldeke's theory, the book itself was composed first during the reign of Khosrow I Anushirvan (r. 531–579), and enlarged in the reign of the last Sasanian monarch, Yazdegerd III (r. 632–651). It was translated into Arabic in the 8th century by the Persian translator and author Ibn al-Muqaffa, a Zoroastrian convert to Islam; this translation, too, is lost. Nöldeke believed that all later histories used al-Muqaffa's translation. In particular, the Annals of al-Tabari and Ferdowsi's Shahnameh are supposed to have best preserved the material of the Khwaday-Namag. While al-Muqaffa did in fact translate a Persian story called Khudāy-Nāma into Arabic, (Note: The title is New Persian.) there were, by the 10th century, many Khudāy-Nāmas (none of which have survived) with different contents, so these cannot all have derived from al-Muqaffa's translation. (Note: One surviving Arabic work that presents itself as a derivation of Ibn al-Muqaffa's translation of the Khwaday-Namag is Nihayat al-arab, but only a small amount of its material may reasonably be traced back to the lost Persian work.) Mahmoud Omidsalar and Touraj Daryaee state that it is very likely that there were already different versions of the Khwaday-Namag in Sasanian times, commissioned by different noble families and telling the same Iranian national epic in different ways. However, they do not exclude that a great Khwaday-Namag was produced by the order of Khosrow I; this version may have been regarded as the finest or most prestigious of all the Khwaday-Namags. The result of this diversity was that the actual histories of the Iranian noble families were "grafted" onto Iranian mythical history and legend in the Khwaday-Namags. Early authors must have used translations of the various Khwaday-Namags and other independent epic stories when writing about ancient Iranian history. Regarding the composition of the Khwaday-Namag, A. Shapour Shahbazi writes that its Sasanian compilers "mingled the memory of recent history with remote past and hoary legends" and did not draw from documentary sources like the Middle Persian inscriptions of the Sasanian kings.

The main source of Ferdowsi's Shahnameh was the Shahnameh of Abu Mansur, a New Persian prose text made in 957 by a number of Zoroastrian scholars and dihqans under the supervision of Abu Mansur Mamari; only the introduction of this work remains today. According to one view, the Shahnameh of Abu Mansur was a translation of a Pahlavi text dating back to Yazdegerd III's time, which was in turn based on an older text from the reign of Khosrow I. According to another view, the Shahnameh of Abu Mansur was a compilation of various sources, not a translation of a single work.

The 6th-century Greek historian Agathias, who included a summary of Sasanian dynastic history and information about Persian religion in his work, apparently drew from the Persian royal records with the help of a translator. It is likely that his material is related to that of later works drawing from the Khwaday-Namag(s). However, it has also been suggested that Agathias's information largely derives from Syriac sources on Sasanian history rather than direct Persian royal records, hence their pro-Christian and pro-Syriac bias; although, per Michael R. J. Bonner, he might have used an official Sasanian Persian source as well.

== Sources ==
- Bonner, M. R. Jackson (2011). "Three Neglected Sources of Sasanian History in the Reign of Khusraw Anushirvan". Studia Iranica. 46. Paris: 1–116.
- Hämeen-Anttila, Jaakko (2018). Khwadāynāmag: The Middle Persian Book of Kings. Brill. doi:10.1163/9789004277649.
- Khalegi-Motlagh, Dj. (1983). "Abū Manṣūr Maʿmarī". In Yarshater, Ehsan (ed.). Encyclopædia Iranica. Vol. I/4: Abū Manṣūr Heravı̄–Adat. London and New York: Routledge & Kegan Paul. p. 337. ISBN 978-0-71009-093-5.
- Omidsalar, Mahmoud; Daryaee, Touraj (2017). "Šāh-nāma nn. The Šāh-nāma as a historical source". In Yarshater, Ehsan (ed.). Encyclopædia Iranica (Online ed.). Encyclopædia Iranica Foundation.
- Shahbazi, A. Sh. (2003). "Historiography ii. Pre-Islamic Period". In Yarshater, Ehsan (ed.). Encyclopædia Iranica. Vol. XII/3: Herat VII–Historiography III (Online ed.). Encyclopædia Iranica Foundation. pp. 325–330.
- Yarshater, Ehsan (1983). "Iranian National History". In Yarshater, Ehsan (ed.). The Cambridge History of Iran: The Seleucid, Parthian and Sasanian Periods. Vol. 3(2). Cambridge: Cambridge University Press. pp. 359–481. ISBN 0-521-24693-8.
- Zeini, Arash (2018). "Xwaday Namag". The Oxford Dictionary of Late Antiquity. Oxford University Press.
