= On the Road to Kandahar =

2007 book by Jason Burke

On the Road to Kandahar: Travels through Conflict in the Islamic World
- Author: Jason Burke
- Language: English
- Subject: International relations
- Publisher: Thomas Dunne Books
- Publication date: May 1, 2007
- Media type: Hardcover
- Pages: 320
- ISBN: 0-312-36622-1
- OCLC: 80360965
- Dewey Decimal: 909/.097670831 22
- LC Class: DS63.1. B87 2007
- Preceded by: Al-Qaeda: Casting a Shadow of Terror

On the Road to Kandahar: Travels through Conflict in the Islamic World is a 2007 nonfiction book written by Jason Burke, chief foreign correspondent of The Observer, based on his experiences living and traveling in various Islamic countries around the world. Much of the book is based in Afghanistan, Pakistan and Iraq.

== See also ==
- Not for the Faint of Heart
- The Pragmatic Entente
