= Babak Farzaneh =

Babak Farzaneh is a researcher, author and a professor of the Arabic Language and literature born in 1964 in Tehran, Imperial State of Iran.

Researcher and scholarly, author and professor of Arabic language and literature. After his college graduation, Farzaneh continued his university education and achieved BSc of Arabic Language and Literature at Isfahan University. In the middle of his career, in 2004, he achieved Associate Professor and at the apex of his educational profession in 2009, he achieved Full Professor. Dr. Farzaneh was invited to University of Toronto as a Visiting Research Associate in January 2011. He fulfilled his researches in the field of Quranic Lexicography at Toronto. Dr. Farzaneh is currently the head of Arabic Language and Literature Department in Islamic Azad University and also the head of Arabic Language and Literature Department in Great Encyclopedia of Islam and Encyclopedia of Iran.

Academic rank: Professor of Arabic Language and Literature

Teaching experience: Islamic Azad University, Tehran University and Visiting Research Associate at Department for Study Of Religion, University of Toronto

== Published books ==
1. Principles of Translation ( Arabic – Persian, Persian – Arabic ), Tehran, Mahboub Publishing Center, February 1998
2. An Introduction to the Basics of Translation, Tehran, Aye Cultural Institute, 2001
3. Recitation and Perception of the Contemporary Arabic Texts, Tehran, Islamic Azad University, 2001
4. Almuḥādathat Al-Arabiyya Al-Mo'aṣira, Islamic Azad University, 2003
5. Contents of the Transcripts of the kazan University, Tatarstan Republic, Russia Federation, Document and Diplomatic History Division, Ministry of Foreign Affairs, Tehran, Library of Ayatollah Mar'ashī Najafī and Global Treasury of Islamic Transcriptions- Qom, 2003
6. Translation of a New Arabic Grammar of the Written Language, Author J. A Haywood & H. M. Nahmad with the title Dastour e Novin e Zaban e Arabi, Tehran, kimiya asar, 2009
7. Mokhtārāt Min al-nuṣūṣ al-mo'āṣira wa al- 'irfāniyyat, Tehran, Shokufehaye Danesh Publisher, 2009
8. Mufradaāt of the Qurʼān (Researches on the History of Arabic & Quranic Lexicons), Tehran, Study and Compilation of Academic Human Sciences Books Center, 2010

== Published articles ==
=== In encyclopedias ===
1. Istifhām, Great Islamic Encyclopedia(GIE), Vol. 8, 1998.
2. Ibn Zubayr(Abulḥasan Aḥmad b. Ali), Great Islamic Encyclopedia(Arabic), Vol. 3, 1998.
3. Ibn Zubayr(Abu Muḥammad ḥasan b. Ali), Great Islamic Encyclopedia(Arabic), Vol. 3, 1998.
4. Ishtiqāq, Great Islamic Encyclopedia, Vol. 9, 2000.
5. Addition(Iḍāfa) in Morphology and Syntax Of Arabic, Great Islamic Encyclopedia, Vol. 9, 2000.
6. Aʿshā hamdān, Great Islamic Encyclopedia, Vol. 9, 2000.
7. Alghāz va Aḥājī, Great Islamic Encyclopedia, Vol. 10, 2001.
8. Alfiyyah, Great Islamic Encyclopedia, Vol. 10. 2001.
9. Badīya, Great Islamic Encyclopedia, Vol. 11, 2002.
10. Bārūdī, Maḥmūd, Great Islamic Encyclopedia, Vol. 11, 2002.
11. Badal, Great Islamic Encyclopedia, Vol. 11, 2002.
12. Badiʿ, Great Islamic Encyclopedia, Vol. 11, 2002.
13. Badiʿiyya, Great Islamic Encyclopedia, Vol. 11, 2002.
14. Bijāna, Great Islamic Encyclopedia, Vol. 11, 2002
15. Taṣrīf, Islamic World License, Vol. 7, 2003.
16. Taṣghīr, Islamic World License, Vol. 7, 2003.
17. Tarkhīm, Islamic World License, Vol. 7, 2003.
18. Tanwīn, Islamic World License, Vol. 8, 2004.
19. Balāghat(Rhetoric), Great Islamic Encyclopedia, Vol. 12, 2004.
20. Bayān(Expression), Great Islamic Encyclopedia, Vol. 13, 2005.
21. Abd Allah b.Abd al Muttalib, Encyclopaedia Islamica, Volume I, Brill, London 2008.
22. Abd Allah b. Jaḥsh, Encyclopaedia Islamica, Volume I, Brill, London, 2008.
23. Abd Allah b.Musa b.Nusayr, Encyclopaedia Islamica, Volume I, Brill, London, 2008.
24. Abd Manāf, Encyclopaedia Islamica, Volume I, Brill, London, 2008.
25. Tashbīh(Similie), Great Islamic Encyclopedia, Vol. 15, 2008.
26. Tarṣīʻ, Great Islamic Encyclopedia, Vol. 15, 2008.
27. Taftāzāni, Muṭawwal, Great Islamic Encyclopedia, Vol. 15, 2008.
28. Tawābiʿ, Great Islamic Encyclopedia, Vol. 16, 2008.
29. Tahmāni b. ʿAmr Kilābī, Great Islamic Encyclopedia, Vol.16, 2008.
30. Thābit b. Moḥammad Jurjānī, Great Islamic Encyclopedia, Vol. 17, 2009.
31. Thamānīnī, Great Islamic Encyclopedia, Vol.17, 2009.
32. Jāḥiẓ, Al-Ḥaywān, Great Islamic Encyclopedia, Vol.17, 2009.
33. Jāmid wa Mushtaq, Great Islamic Encyclopedia, Vol.17, 2009.
34. Jarmī, Great Islamic Encyclopedia, Vol.17, 2009.
35. Jaʿfar b. ulbat ḥārithī, Great Islamic Encyclopedia, Vol.17, 2009.
36. Jirān al-ʿawd, Great Islamic Encyclopedia, Vol.17, 2009.
37. Study and Teaching of Arabic Language, Encyclopaedia Islamica, London, Undergone Publishing.
38. Jumayḥ, Great Islamic Encyclopedia, Undergone Publishing.
39. Jandī, Great Islamic Encyclopedia, Vol. 18. 2010
40. Jazʾirī, Great Islamic Encyclopedia,. Vol. 18. 2010
41. Jumla, Great Islamic Encyclopedia, Vol. 18. 2010.
42. Jamīl Al-Mudawwar, Great Islamic Encyclopedia, Vol. 18. 2010.
43. Ṣāḥib b. ʻAbbād, Daneshnam e zaban e farsii, Undergone Publishing.
44. Ḥassān b. Mālik, Great Islamic Encyclopedia, Undergone Publishing.
45. Ḥarf Taʿrīf(Definitive), Great Islamic Encyclopedia, Undergone Publishing.
46. Ḥarmala b. Munḏir, Great Islamic Encyclopedia, Undergone Publishing.

=== In journals ===
1. "A look at the Properties of Arabic Poems before Islam", Sokhan Ahl-e- Del, Monthly Journal, 1993.
2. "Madiheh and Chanting", Sokhan Ahl-e- Del, Monthly Journal, 1993.
3. "Torkan Era", Sokhan Ahl-e- Del, Monthly Journal, 1993.
4. "a brief look at the history of morphology and critique knowledge and an investigation of the Shafieh book by Ibn Ḥajib", Faculty of Literature, Journal of Tehran University, P. 105–114, 2002.
5. "How to use basic Cultures in Arabic Language", Theology professional letter, Seasonal Journal, P. 1, No. 1, 2003.
6. "Translation of the Present Continuous verbs in Quran", Investigation and Articles of Theology Faculty of Tehran University Journal, P 103–115, 2004.
7. "Dirāsātun ḥawla ġarīb al-qurʼān va al ḥadīth", Scientific and Research Journal Religious Research, No. 12, 2005.
8. "Meanings of the verb Kāda in Quran", Scientific Research Journal of Sahifeh Mobin, No. 37, 2006.
9. "Zamakhsharī wa Kashshāf", Scientific Research Journal of Sahifeh Mobin, No. 38, 2006.
10. "Evolution of Arabic Alphabet under the protection of Quran", Scientific Research letter of Quran and Hadith, Second year, No. 2, 2007.
11. "Mugaṭṭaʻat Alphabet in Quran and its Secrets in Media", Scientific Research Journal of sahifeh Mobin, No. 43, 2008.
12. "Tatimmat al Yatīmat Revised by Abas Eghbal", Mīrāth Maktūb Publisher.
13. "Notes on some Persian words in the works of al-Ğāḥiẓ", Arabica,58,436-445, Brill, Leiden, 2011.
14. "Syntactic Eloquence of Passive Structures in the holy Quran", Scientific Research Journal of sahifeh Mobin, No. 47, 2010.
15. " The Semantics of Ḥaṣab in the Kuran, Notes on the Bellamy's article: "Some Proposed Emendations to the Text of the Kuran", Sahifeh Mobīn, No. 49, 2012

== Conferences attended ==
1. "Religious Violence and Nonviolence", Religion and Human Phenomenon, World Congress International Association History of Religions, University of Toronto, 15–22 August 2010.
2. "A Comparative Lexical Analysis of the Firewood of hell(Haṣabu ğahannama)", Free Linguistics Conference, University of Sydney, Australia, sep 6, 2010
