= Mujahideen of Saturday =

Mujahideen of Saturday (Persian: مجاهدین روز شنبه) is a term used by Ahmad Kasravi and Mehdi Malekzadeh in their books of History of the Iranian Constitutional Revolution. Originally, this term mentions those politicians who weren't Constitutionalists in Persian Constitutional Revolution but when Mohammad Ali Shah was deposed, suddenly they changed their faction. Two examples that Kasravi and Malekzadeh used for this term were Qavam os-Saltaneh and Vossug ed Dowleh, two brother that in Constitutional Revolution were in Authoritarians faction but after triumph of Tehran, they became Constitutionalists and became prime ministers in Ahmad Shah reign.

== Background ==
On July 13, 1909, the Constitutionalist forces led by Mohammad Vali Khan Tonekaboni from Gilan, Najaf-Qoli Khan Bakhtiari and Sardar Asad Bakhtiari from Isfahan and Yeprem Khan from Qazvin marched towards Tehran. By pledging the royal jewels, Mohammad Ali Shah borrowed 50,000 tomans from a Russian loan bank and paid part of the soldiers' arrears. The military forces of both sides were ready for war, but Sa'd al-Dawla was trying to negotiate and resolve the issue peacefully. To this end, he asked Sardar Asad and Mohammad Vali Khan to send representatives to negotiate with him; However, the course of events was such that Sa'd al-Dawla's measures did not succeed and his colleagues resigned. The war broke out between the state Cossacks and the constitutionalist forces, and on the evening of July 15, the war ended in favor of the constitutionalists. The next day, Mohammad Ali Shah and his relatives took refuge in the Russian embassy and Sa'd al-Dawla in the British embassy.

After five days of fighting; Finally, the constitutional forces were able to take full control of Tehran. Meanwhile, the leaders of these forces settled in the Baharestan mansion and took over the affairs of Tehran. After the siege of Mohammad Ali Shah in the Russian embassy; Representatives of Russia and the United Kingdom met with two constitutional leaders at the Baharestan Mansion. Eventually, after political talks, Mohammad Ali Shah was deposed and the new king (Ahmad Shah) ascended the throne and Ali Reza Khan Azod al-Molk became regent.

The day the constitutionalists succeeded in Triumph of Tehran was Friday in Iran. The next day, Saturday, a number of prominent authoritarians took to the streets of Tehran, chanting Constitutionalists slogans and asking for a share. But people ridiculed them and called them "Mujahideen of Saturday". However, some of them, like Qavam os-Saltaneh, rose to various positions during the reign of Ahmad Shah.

== Ahmad Kasravi Narration ==
Ahmad Kasravi in his book, History of the Iranian Constitutional Revolution, after defining the story of Triumph of Tehran, uses this term and defines an example:

... Qavam os-Saltaneh and Vossug ed Dowleh, two brothers who, except for looting, plunder and abuse of the name of Libertarianism, had no other purpose, armed themselves and put the name of Mujahideen on themselves and showed themselves as partners in the honors of the real Mujahideen on Friday who sacrificed their lives to save the freedom of the country. Of course, this issue was not hidden from the people and they were called Mujahideen of Saturday. The sad part was that these traitors later came to power in the young Ahmad Shah government and slowly misled the Constitutional Revolution, which aimed to liberate Iran. Now to anyone who does not have the slightest interference in the important work done by others and he does not have the slightest interference in its implementation, and yet considers himself a partner in it, to mocking them called them Mujahideen of Saturday

== Mehdi Malekzadeh Narration ==
Mehdi Malekzadeh has a famous book called History of the Iranian Constitutional Revolution, which is one of the most authoritative sources in the field of the Constitutional Revolution. Malekzadeh tells a different story from Kasravi about the definition of this term:

... One of the most prominent examples of the Mujahideen of Saturday was Mohsen Khan's uncle, whose name I better not mention here. Unlike Uncle, Mohsen Khan was a patriot and showed courage in the battles of Mazandaran and tried hard to arrest and help the poor. After the formation of the Democratic Party in Iran, which at that time was called the Revolutionaries, he became a member of that party and then joined this group when the Gendarmerie was formed. He had bequeathed that if he was killed, he would sell his property and pay for the construction of the tomb of Sayyid Jamal al-Din Va'iz. Finally, he was killed in a battle in Lorestan and his survivors obeyed his will and built the tomb of Sayyid Jamal al-Din Va'iz. Mohsen Khan had said of his great-uncle that he was perhaps one of the most accurate examples of the Mojahedin on Saturday. He was one of the most famous authoritarians who joined the constitutionalist faction after the conquest of Tehran. According to Mohsen Khan: "At the dawn of the constitution, the uncles believed that these rumors had no basis and that these games were provided by the clergy for their own benefit and ended with a small amount of money given to them by the government." But after the signing of the constitutional decree and the inauguration of the parliament, these uncles went to the parliament together with the other constitutionalists and swore in support of the constitution and shed tears while swearing: He established the movement and spoke in the assemblies and circles about the interests of the national government and the law, and did not refrain from expressing the hatred of the authoritarian regime.

But a few months later, when the news of the rise of the constitutionalists was heard and it became clear that the rule of Mohammad Ali Shah would sooner or later be overthrown, he procedure changed. When he was sure that the national army was moving towards Tehran, he asked for his constitutional nephew and asked him to attract the opinion of the constitutionalists. One day before the conquest of Tehran, uncle gathered 25 young people from the family and prepared them to enter. He gave a speech to these young people, talking about his constitutionalism and the fact that he had libertarian ideals since the time of Shah Shahid (Naser al-Din Shah), and he said conservatively that we could not predict which side would win, but remember that we have to go in a direction that don't ruined our position. Then, at the order of his uncle, he told his son to buy a sheep and bring it home. He provided two sets of clothes for the Mujahideen and the authoritarians, wounding some people in mud and dirt, bandaging them and destroying part of his house by firing on them. He was at home throughout the conquest of Tehran. The Mujahideen entered Tehran and ousted Mohammad Ali Shah from the monarchy and elected his twelve-year-old son Ahmad Mirza as king. On Saturday, when everyone went to Baharestan Square to celebrate and dance, Uncle Jan left the house in the clothes of the Mujahideen, along with the same 25 young men whose clothes were dirty and torn, shouting for Long live the constitution.

When they reached Baharestan Square, he went to the Mojahedin and shake hands with them. The uncle, who had a history of friendship with Mohammad Vali Khan Tonekaboni, sided with him and delivered a speech for the constitution at the Sepahsalar Mosque. A speech that even those who were with him at home believed in what bravery he had done in the past year and a month to return to the constitution and conquer Tehran. From that moment on, uncle joined the constitutional commanders as one of the so-called Mujahideen, and very soon he was able to enter the government and, like many other Mujahideen of Saturday, take his share of the change faction on Saturday.

== in Modern day Culture ==
The term Mujahideen of Saturday today refers not only to the Constitutional Revolution, but also to all those who in the history of Iran succeeded in seizing power in such ways, and even at times counter-revolutionary and suppressed the freedom fighters. The term is also defined as follows: Whenever a person or persons in doing something important, the realization of which required risk; They do not have the slightest involvement but pretend to be proud to participate in it. Such a person or persons is called "Mujahideen of Saturday".
