= Enayatollah Reza =

Iranian professor and military officer (1920–2010)

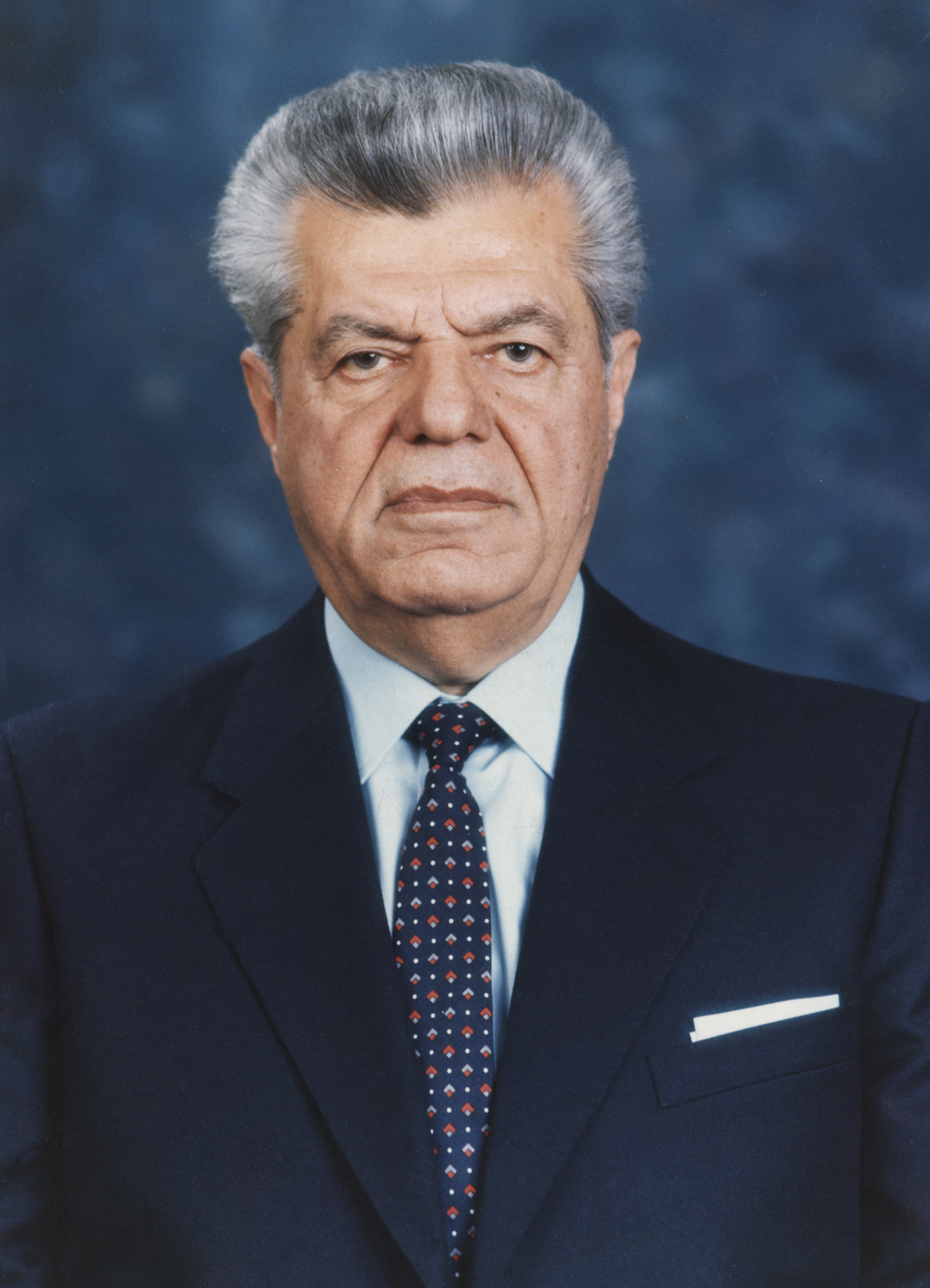
- Enayatollah Reza
- Born: 28 June 1920; Rasht, Gilan province, Sublime State of Iran
- Died: 20 July 2010 (aged 90); Tehran, Iran
- Occupation: Scholar
- Known for: Philosophy, History of Philosophy
- Relatives: Fazlollah Reza (brother)

Enayatollah Reza (Persian: عنایت‌الله رضا; 18 June 1920 in Rasht – 20 July 2010 in Tehran) was an Iranian historian and professor of philosophy, a former member of the Communist Tudeh Party of Iran, and a former Iranian military officer. He was a member of the Supreme Academic Council of the Centre for Iranian and Islamic Studies in Tehran, Iran, the publishers of the Encyclopaedia Islamica. His research concerned the historical regions of Iranian Azerbaijan and Caucasian Arran; based on this research, he claimed that "Azerbaijan" should properly refer only to the land south of the Aras River (in Iran) and that the country of Azerbaijan should instead be called "Aran".

== Works ==
- The Sasanian Civilization (alternatively titled Civilization of Sassanid Iran, translation of book by Vladimir Grigorevich Lukonin)
- Azerbaijan va Arran (Albania-e Qafqaz) (in English: Azerbaijan and Aran (Albania of Caucasus))
- From Aran to Azerbaijan, Goftogu Quarterly 33, Spring 2002.

== See also ==
- Fazlollah Reza (brother)
