= History of the Iranian Constitutional Revolution =

1940 book by Ahmad Kasravi

History of the Iranian Constitutional Revolution (Persian: تاریخ مشروطهٔ ایران) is a non-fiction book by the Iranian historian Ahmad Kasravi. Cited as the most accurate account of the Persian Constitutional Revolution, it chronicles the event and the ensuing struggle of the revolution that took place between 1905 and 1911 in Persia (known today as Iran).

The book was originally written in 1940 in Persian. In 2006, the first volume of the book was translated to English and published by American scholar Evan Siegel.

== Books ==
- Ahmad Kasravi, Tarikh-e Mashruteh-ye Iran (تاریخ مشروطهٔ ایران) (History of the Iranian Constitutional Revolution), in Persian, 951 p. (Negāh Publications, Tehran, 2003), ISBN 964-351-138-3.

Note: This book is also available in two volumes, published by Amir Kabir Publications in 1984. Amir Kabir's 1961 edition is in one volume, 934 pages.

- Ahmad Kasravi, History of the Iranian Constitutional Revolution: Tarikh-e Mashrute-ye Iran, Volume I, translated into English by Evan Siegel, 347 p. (Mazda Publications, Costa Mesa, California, 2006). ISBN 1-56859-197-7

== See also ==
- The Comprehensive History of Iran
- Iran Between Two Revolutions
- Foucault in Iran: Islamic Revolution after the Enlightenment
