= Electoral history of Alan Keyes =

Elections featuring American politician

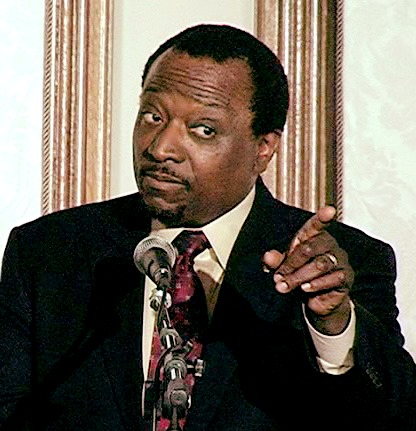
Alan Keyes

This is the electoral history of Alan Keyes, a frequent candidate. He has never been elected to office.

== Maryland Senate campaign 1988 ==
=== General election ===
- Sen. Paul Sarbanes, Democrat (inc.): 999,166 (61.79%)
- Alan Keyes, Republican: 617,537 (38.19%)

Official Results: http://clerk.house.gov/member_info/electionInfo/1988election.pdf

== Maryland Senate campaign 1992 ==
=== Republican primary ===
- Alan Keyes: 95,831 (45.94%)
- State Delegate Martha Scanlan Klima: 20,758 (9.95%)
- State's Attorney Joseph Cassilly: 16,091 (7.71%)
- Ross Zimmerman Pierpont: 12,658 (6.07%)
- S. Rob Sobhani: 12,423 (5.96%)
- State Senator John Bishop Jr.: 9,451 (4.53%)
- Eugene Robert Zarwell: 6,535 (3.13%)
- James H. Berry: 6,282 (3.01%)
- Romie A. Songer: 6,030 (2.89%)
- Joyce Friend-Nalepka: 5,835 (2.80%)
- Edward R. Shannon: 4,578 (2.20%)
- Scott L. Meredith: 4,372 (2.10%)
- Stuart Hopkins: 3,717 (1.78%)
- Herman J. Hannan: 2,771 (1.33%)

Source: http://www.ourcampaigns.com/RaceDetail.html?RaceID=24700

=== General election ===
- Sen. Barbara Mikulski, Democratic (inc): 1,307,610 (71.00%)
- Alan Keyes, Republican: 533,668 (28.98%)

Official Results: http://clerk.house.gov/member_info/electionInfo/1992/92Stat.htm#20

== U.S. presidential election campaign 1996 ==
=== Republican primaries ===
- Bob Dole - 9,024,742 (58.82%)
- Pat Buchanan - 3,184,943 (20.76%)
- Steve Forbes - 1,751,187 (11.41%)
- Lamar Alexander - 495,590 (3.23%)
- Alan Keyes - 471,716 (3.08%)
- Richard Lugar - 127,111 (0.83%)
- Uncommitted - 123,278 (0.80%)
- Phil Gramm - 71,456 (0.47%)
- Bob Dornan - 42,140 (0.28%)

=== Republican convention ===
- Bob Dole 1928
- Pat Buchanan: 47
- Steve Forbes: 2
- Alan Keyes: 1
- Robert Bork: 1

== U.S. presidential election campaign 2000 ==
=== Republican primaries ===
- George W. Bush - 12,034,676 (62.00%)
- John McCain - 6,061,332 (31.23%)
- Alan Keyes - 985,819 (5.08%)
- Steve Forbes - 171,860 (0.89%)
- Uncommitted - 61,246 (0.32%)
- Gary Bauer - 60,709 (0.31%)
- Orrin Hatch - 15,958 (0.08%)

=== Republican convention ===
- George W. Bush: 4328
- Alan Keyes: 6
- John McCain: 1

== Illinois Senate campaign 2004 ==
- Barack Obama, Democrat: 3,597,456 (70.0%)
- Alan Keyes, Republican: 1,390,690 (27.0%)
- Al Franzen, Independent: 81,164 (1.6%)
- Jerry Kohn, Libertarian: 69,253 (1.3%)

Official Results: http://clerk.house.gov/member_info/electionInfo/2004/2004Stat.htm#13

== U.S. presidential election campaign 2008 ==
=== Republican primaries ===
- John McCain - 9,838,910 (46.49%)
- Mitt Romney - 4,681,436 (22.12%)
- Mike Huckabee - 4,281,900 (20.23%)
- Ron Paul - 1,214,563 (5.74%)
- Rudy Giuliani - 597,499 (2.82%)
- Fred Thompson - 303,845 (1.44%)
- Uncommitted - 70,873 (0.34%)
- Alan Keyes - 59,636 (0.28%)
- Duncan Hunter - 39,883 (0.19%)

=== Constitution Party convention ===
- Chuck Baldwin - 383.8
- Alan Keyes - 125.7
- Max Riekse - 4.5
- Daniel Imperato - 1.0
- Susan Ducey - 1.0
