= Manufactured Crisis: The Untold Story of the Iran Nuclear Scare =

2014 book about Iran's alleged nuclear capabilities

- Front cover of the book showing Israel PM Benjamin Netanyahu speaking before UN general assembly
- Author: Gareth Porter
- Language: English
- Publisher: Just World Books
- Publication date: February 1, 2014
- Publication place: United States
- Pages: 310
- ISBN: 978-1935982333
- Website: Just World Books Webstore

Manufactured Crisis: The Untold Story of the Iran Nuclear Scare is a 2014 book authored by Gareth Porter, an American historian, investigative journalist, author and policy analyst specializing in U.S. national security policy. In this 310-page book, he asserts that Iran's nuclear energy program has been peaceful, arguing that the evidence widely cited to demonstrate Iran's nuclear weapons ambitions is fabricated by Israel and the United States.

== Contents ==
The book consists of the following chapters:

1. The US Denial Policy and Its Consequences
2. The Politics of Iran’s Nuclear Secrecy
3. Iran’s Unknown Nuclear Politics
4. US Political Origins of the Nuclear Scare
5. Israeli Political Origins of the Nuclear Scare
6. Choosing Regime Change Over Diplomacy
7. The IAEA Comes Up Empty
8. The Mystery of the Laptop Documents
9. Intelligence Failure
10. The Phantom Bomb Test Chamber of Parchin
11. Phony War Crises

== Synopsis ==
Starting with "U.S. support for the Iraqis during the 1980s Iraq–Iran War", the book argues that with the collapse of the Soviet Union and the ending of the Cold War, Americans saved the CIA by giving it a new reason to exist, the new threat posed by the combination of "weapons of mass destruction" and "terror". Taking seriously the declarations of Ali Khamenei, Iran's supreme leader, and of his predecessor, Ruhollah Khomeini, that nuclear weapons are against teachings of Islam and hence Iran is not seeking them, Porter says that the pressure by U.S. to prevent Tehran's development of its civilian nuclear program left them with only the Hobson's choice of working covertly and covering their tracks.

According to John Waterbury, "The risk for Israel and the United States, of course, is that they might have to go to war to confront a threat that, Porter alleges, they know does not exist."

According to the Fars News Agency, in addition to explaining why Tehran covered its nuclear activity, the author deals with the issues such as the alleged smuggled laptop, Parchin test chamber and the role of Israel in creating the crisis.

Porter argues in his book that the root of the crisis is in fact "Washington's denial of Iran's right to a peaceful nuclear program" and not "Iran's defiance of the nuclear nonproliferation treaty."

== Reception ==
According to Al-Monitor columnist Akiva Eldar, a number of contentions in Porter's book have been independently made by Uzi Eilam, a senior intelligence source who won the Israel Security Prize and served in the Israeli Atomic Energy Commission as a director for nine years. Senior Israeli security officials said Eilam was not aware of recent information and that he is "out of the loop".

Shmuel Meir, a research fellow at the Center for Strategic Studies at Tel Aviv University and former researcher at the IDF's intelligence unit and the IDF’s Planning Department strategic unit, called Porter "the only journalist and investigator in the world who read, with an unbiased eye, all the IAEA reports and the American intelligence reports of the last several decades regarding the Iranian issue" and said that the book was "highly detailed and well-documented" and suitable for "all interested in understanding how we arrived at the Iranian nuclear crisis, and the 'attack scenarios', and invented facts and intelligence reports whose purpose was to support the preconceptions".

Josh Ruebner in Foreign Policy in Focus wrote that the book is "meticulously researched and richly detailed". Among Porter's conclusions is one that regards the efforts to include Iran's ballistic missiles within the nuclear negotiations after the interim deal was signed without them as "an Israeli-inspired monkey wrench thrown by its lobby ... to derail the talks". Alex Cacioppo's review in Muftah says that, using information from "open source documentation and revealed through in-depth interviews with key players", Porter draws a different picture from the experts and politicians who portray Iran as a "transgressing power with nefarious nuclear ambitions".

In October 2014, Hans Blix, former director general of the IAEA and former executive chairman of the United Nations Monitoring, Verification and Inspection Commission (UNMOVIC), participated in a televised HBO History Makers Series conference with the Council on Foreign Relations. When asked if he thought Iran's nuclear program could be successfully monitored, he replied that he was more worried about the handling of intelligence, "because there is as much disinformation as there is information. There was a book published by Gareth Porter in the U.S. some time ago about the whole Iranian affair, and, well, he certainly maintains that much of the evidence that was given to the IAEA was really cooked, was not authentic. And I wouldn't be at all surprised." According to the publisher of Porter's book, shortly after it was published, Blix wrote: "I feel grateful to Gareth Porter for his intrusive and critical examination of intelligence material passed to the IAEA." Alluding to the assassinations of Iranian nuclear scientists, he added: "When security organizations do not shy away from assassinating nuclear scientists we can take it for certain that they do not for a moment hesitate to circulate false evidence."

According to William Beeman, professor and chair of the Department of Anthropology, University of Minnesota, Porter's narration of how consensus was built over the threat of Iran's nuclear program is fascinating because he has created a convincing account of the incident which demonstrates how the background for attacking Iran was mixed with "lies and misinformation" over many years. He makes prominent mention of Robert Gates, an increasingly influential member of the US government who eventually became Secretary of Defense, as a possible "prime mover" of this Iran policy. Porter "exposes the many lies and half-truths that have been promulgated over more than two decades to try and convince the American public and the world that Iran is the chief danger to international peace through its nuclear program".

Paul R. Pillar, a 28-year veteran of the Central Intelligence Agency (CIA) until his retirement in 2005, described the book in a Middle East Policy Council journal review as "an admirably thorough treatment" of the Iranian nuclear program and the perception of it and response to it by Israeli and American policymakers. He wrote that the book's two most significant contributions are "as an overall history of the understanding, or misunderstanding, of the Iranian program" and its debunking of "the conventional wisdom that Iran is set on getting nuclear weapons", and noted Porter's thorough examination and assessment of both. Pillar said that Porter was "much less convincing", however, when he failed to support his repetition of the old cliché that to maintain their funding levels, almost all of the American security establishment was exaggerating the actual threat of weapons proliferation. He also noted that Porter's "effort to spread attributions of bias around very broadly" resulted in a minimization of the actual political differences of the various presidential administrations, especially the "sharp" distinction between the George W. Bush and Barack Obama policies.

== Translation ==
The book is translated into Persian and published in Iran. Both translation and publication is done by Fars News Agency publication.

== See also ==
- Not for the Faint of Heart
- The Pragmatic Entente
- The CIA Insider's Guide to the Iran Crisis
