= Mahmoud Omidsalar =

Iranian literary critic

- محمود امیدسالار
- Born: November 26, 1950; Isfahan, Iran
- Education: University of California, Berkeley (PhD)
- Scientific career
- Fields: Persian literature, linguistics, poetics

Mahmoud Omidsalar (Persian: محمود امیدسالار; born November 26, 1950) is an Iranian literary critic and Jordan Center for Persian Studies' Scholar in Residence. He is known for his research on Persian epic and Shahnameh in particular. He is an editor of the Encyclopaedia Iranica and an author of The Comprehensive History of Iran. He has criticized Eurocentrism and Orientalism in his works.
