= Behrooz Ghamari-Tabrizi =

Iranian historian and sociologist

Behrooz Ghamari-Tabrizi بهروز قمری تبریزی
- Born: June 28, 1960 (age 66)
- Other name: Behrooz Ghamari Tabrizi
- Education: University of California, Santa Cruz (PhD)
- Scientific career
- Fields: History of modern Iran
- Workplaces: Princeton University
- Thesis: Islamism and the Quest for Alternative Modernities (1998)
- Doctoral advisor: Paul Lubeck

Behrooz Ghamari-Tabrizi (Persian: بهروز قمری تبریزی; born 28 June 1960) is an Iranian-born American historian, sociologist, and professor. He is known for his works on the Iranian revolution and its aftermath. Ghamari-Tabrizi serves as NIAC Community Council Member. He is also a Visiting Scholar at the Center for Place, Culture, and Politics at the CUNY Graduate Center.

== Career ==
Ghamari-Tabrizi received a PhD in 1998 from the University of California, Santa Cruz.

He taught at Princeton University from 2019 to 2024. Previously he was professor of history and sociology and the Director of the Center for South Asian and Middle Eastern Studies at the University of Illinois, Urbana-Champaign. He was awarded a Beckman Fellowship in 2008.

== Publications ==
- Ghamari-Tabrizi, Behrooz (1998). Islamism and the Quest for Alternative Modernities (dissertation). University of California, Santa Cruz.
- Ghamari-Tabrizi, Behrooz (2008). Islam and Dissent in Post-Revolutionary Iran: Abdolkarim Soroush and the Religious Foundations of Political Reform. International Library of Iranian Studies series. New York, NY: I.B. Tauris. ISBN 978-1845118808.
- Ghamari-Tabrizi, Behrooz (2016). Foucault in Iran: Islamic Revolution after the Enlightenment. Minneapolis, MN: University of Minnesota Press. ISBN 9781452950563.
- Ghamari-Tabrizi, Behrooz (2016). Remembering Akbar: Inside the Iranian Revolution. New York, NY: OR Books. ISBN 9781944869038.

== See also ==
- Foucault in Iran: Islamic Revolution after the Enlightenment
