= W. B. Fisher =

British geographer (1916–1984)

- Born: William Bayne Fish; September 24, 1916; Darwen, Lancashire, England
- Died: June 29, 1984 (aged 67)
- Other name: Bill Fisher
- Awards: Murchison Award (1973)

William Bayne Fisher (born Fish; September 24, 1916 – June 29, 1984) was a British geographer. Starting in 1954, he was head of the Department of Geography at Durham University, and gained the title of Professor in 1956, holding both until his 1981 retirement. He was also head of the Graduate Society 1965–81. His work had a particular focus on the Middle East, especially Libya and Iran. He was familiar with many languages, including fluency in French and reading comprehension in German, Italian and Spanish, though his skills in Middle Eastern languages are described variously as "able to succeed across the region" and "circumscribed."

He served on the Governing Council of the British Institute of Persian Studies from 1964 until his death. In 1968, he edited volume one of The Cambridge History of Iran.
