= Uzi Eilam =

Israeli military general

- עוזי עילם
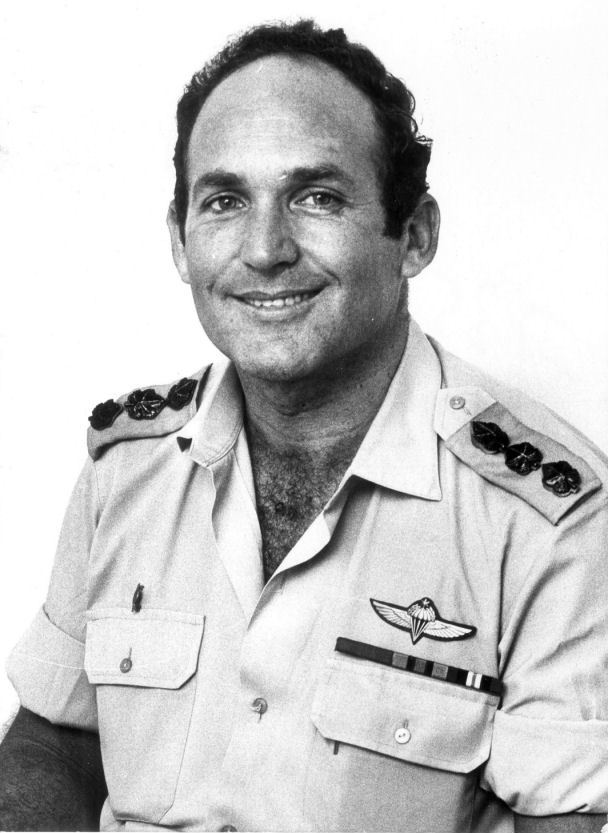
- Uzi Eilam, ca 1973
- Born: Kibbutz Tel Yosef, Israel
- Military career
- Allegiance: Israel
- Branch: Israel Defense Forces
- Rank: Brigadier general
- Unit: Paratroopers Brigade
- Conflicts: Suez Crisis; Six-Day War
- Other work: Former director of the Israel Atomic Energy Commission

Uzi Eilam (Hebrew: עוזי עילם) is a retired IDF brigadier general and former director of the Israel Atomic Energy Commission. Closely involved in many of the most crucial decision-making events in the State of Israel's history, he had commanded various Israeli military units during his service to IDF.

== Early life ==
He was born and raised in Kibbutz Tel Yosef, where he had to fight the elders to be allowed to study. He did his mechanical engineering bachelor's degree at Technion and got a M.Sc. in industrial engineering. Alongside Ariel Sharon, he served in Israel's southern borders as a combat paratrooper during 1950s. In the 1956 Sinai campaign, Eilam was a company commander of paratroopers. He was also a battalion commander in the paratroop brigade fighting in Jerusalem during the Six-Day War and the commander of a paratroop brigade in the Jordan Valley in 1969 and 1970. Eilam was selected in 1973 to head the Military Research and Development Unit in the IDF and was promoted to Brigadier General. In 1976 he was appointed by Prime Minister Yitzhak Rabin to serve for 10 years as Director General of the Israeli Atomic Energy Commission. From 1986 to 1997 eilam was the Chief Scientist of the MOD and the director of the defense R&D. After 12 years of leading the R&D Eilam was sent to Paris to head the MOD mission to Europe. General Eilam retired from the Government on 2001.

== Views ==
=== Nuclear program of Iran ===
Coming from "the heart of Israel's secret security mechanisms", he believes that Benjamin Netanyahu is using the threat of atomic Iran as a means of reaching "his own political aims". He said: "Netanyahu and other politicians have struck terrible, unnecessary fear into the hearts of the Israeli public, and thankfully the flames fanned over the issue seemed to have died down for now." He does not believe that Tehran is even close to having a bomb. "The Iranian nuclear program will only be operational in another 10 years," declares Eilam. "Even so, I am not sure that Iran wants the bomb," he added.

== Books ==
- Eilam's Arc: How Israel Became a Military Technology Powerhouse, Sussex Academic Press (September 1, 2011)
- California Triangle - A fiction thriller on countering the efforts of Iran to spy on Israeli-American missiles defense in the Silicon Valley.
- A Trap in Paris - A fiction thriller on French-American-Israeli task force blocking the illegal purchasing of strategic materials for Iran in Europe.
- Singapore under Attack - A fiction thriller on Iranian effort to terrorize Singapore.

== See also ==
- Manufactured Crisis: The Untold Story of the Iran Nuclear Scare
