= Jason Burke =

British journalist and author

- Born: 1970 (age 55–56)
- Education: University of Oxford
- Occupations: Journalist, author
- Writing career
- Genre: Non-fiction
- Notable works: Al-Qaeda: Casting a Shadow of Terror; On the Road to Kandahar

Jason Burke (born 1970) is a British journalist and the author of several non-fiction books. As of 2016 he was a correspondent covering Africa for The Guardian, based in Johannesburg, having previously been based in New Delhi as the same paper's South Asia correspondent. In his years of journalism, Burke has addressed a wide range of topics including politics, social affairs and culture in Europe and the Middle East. He has written extensively on Islamic extremism and, among numerous other conflicts, covered the wars of 2001 in Afghanistan and 2003 in Iraq, the latter of which he described as "entirely justifiable from a humanitarian perspective".

In 2003, Burke wrote Al-Qaeda: Casting a Shadow of Terror, which was later updated and republished as Al-Qaeda: The True Story of Radical Islam. Noam Chomsky described it as the "best book there is" on Al-Qaeda. He was interviewed in the 2004 BBC documentary The Power of Nightmares. In 2006, he wrote On the Road to Kandahar: Travels through Conflict in the Islamic World.

== Biography ==
Burke attended Oxford University. For four years, he held a position as an investigative reporter at the Sunday Times. He relocated to Pakistan in 1998 to cover events there and in Afghanistan. During this period, he also travelled to Baghdad and Basra. Around 2000, he was hired by The Observer to serve as its chief foreign correspondent. Since then, he has become the South Asia correspondent for The Guardian, The Observer's sister publication, as well. As of 2010, he was based in New Delhi.

Prior to his assignment to New Delhi, Burke was based in Afghanistan, Pakistan, and Paris, but his work has taken him to many locations. According to a book review in 2006 in The Daily Telegraph, Burke "is one of the journalistic band of brothers whose job is to get to the trouble spots ahead of the TV crews and show the electronic media what it is all about". His travels have included Gaza, Kurdistan, Thailand, Algeria, and Jordan, among others. He is the author of On the Road to Kandahar and the critically acclaimed The 9/11 Wars, released in October 2011.

Burke's book The Revolutionists: The Story of the Extremists Who Hijacked the 1970s was published in October 2025. It was shortlisted for the 2025 Baillie Gifford Prize. Kirkus Reviews described the book as "intelligent and enlightening" and "an authoritative epic".

== Bibliography ==
- Al-Qaeda: The True Story of Radical Islam (ISBN 1-85043-666-5)
- Al-Qaeda: Casting a Shadow of Terror (ISBN 1-85043-396-8)
- On the Road to Kandahar: Travels through Conflict in the Islamic World (ISBN 0-385-66236-X), (ISBN 0-7139-9896-2)
- The 9/11 Wars (ISBN 978-0141044590)
- The New Threat: The Past, Present, and Future of Islamic Militancy
- The Revolutionists: The Story of the Extremists Who Hijacked the 1970s (ISBN 9781847926067)
