= National Security and Nuclear Diplomacy =

2011 book by Hassan Rowhani

- Cover of the 3rd edition
- Author: Hassan Rouhani
- Original title: امنیت ملی و دیپلماسی هسته‌ای
- Language: Persian
- Subject: Nuclear program of Iran; Politics of Iran
- Publisher: Center for Strategic Research
- Publication date: 2011
- Publication place: Iran
- Media type: Print (hardcover)
- Pages: 1209 pp
- ISBN: 978-600-290-007-4 (3rd ed)

National Security and Nuclear Diplomacy (Persian: امنیت ملی و دیپلماسی هسته‌ای) is the memoir of Hassan Rouhani, the former President of Iran and the first secretary of Iran's Supreme National Security Council. Rouhani led Iran's nuclear case under President Akbar Hashemi Rafsanjani and President Mohammad Khatami as tensions began to escalate over Iran's nuclear program. Approximately two years after the book was published in 2011, Rouhani was elected as President of Iran on 15 June 2013. The book focuses on Iran's nuclear program and challenges to it by Western countries, especially the United States and three European countries of France, Germany and the United Kingdom. The book covers a period of 678 days (from October 6, 2003, to August 15, 2005) when Rouhani and his team were handling Iran's nuclear case. Furthermore, the history of Iran's nuclear technology and the process of achieving complete nuclear fuel cycle are major topics of the book.

National Security and Nuclear Diplomacy is the first book written by a leader of Iran's nuclear negotiating team. Other memoirs have been also published on Iran's nuclear case including by Mohamed ElBaradei (former Director-General of IAEA), Joschka Fischer (former German foreign minister), Jack Straw (former British foreign secretary), and Hossein Mousavian (a former member of Iran's nuclear negotiating team).

== Summary ==
National Security and Nuclear Diplomacy consists of 12 chapters and 7 appendices on 1,209 pages and is the first comprehensive book so far published on Iran's nuclear energy program, and is considered an oral history book.

The first chapter, titled Islamic Revolution and Nuclear Technology (1979-2003), focuses on the outset of nuclear technology following the Islamic Revolution and Iran's need for nuclear energy. The second chapter, titled Challenges and Structures, introduces the structure of decision-making in Iran, especially the Supreme National Security Council, and its role in the nuclear case. Chapter three is about the Evolution of Nuclear Tension and New Requisites (August 2002-October 2003) and how Iran's nuclear case faced problems with the IAEA and European countries.

Chapter four, Eliminating National Security Threats (October 2003 – November 2003), tells the memories of the author as he started off as head of the nuclear team within the Supreme National Security Council, including an account of Saadabad negotiations and declaration (in Tehran). In the fifth chapter, New Crisis and Enhanced Efforts, the author explains they managed a crisis resulting from Atomic Energy Organization of Iran's first incomplete report to the IAEA, especially its omission to refer to the blueprints of the second-generation (P2) centrifuges. In the sixth chapter, Diplomacy in Crisis (August 2004 – December 2004), the author focuses on the exchanging plans between Iran and Europe. and a confrontation between Iran and the United States over the normalization of Iran's nuclear case.

The seventh chapter, titled Paris Agreement, concentrates on domestic and international conditions and the Paris agreement. Chapter eight, Beginning of Negotiations and a Chance to Create Opportunity, discusses the performance of three working groups which were established following Paris agreement. In the ninth chapter, New Hopes, criticizes Europeans during negotiations and also explains Iran's initiative for offering a four-stage plan for industrial-level enrichment.

In chapter ten, which is titled Distrust and Doubt focuses on international consequences of Iran's decision to launch the Uranium Conversion Facility (UCF). In chapter eleven, Changing Red Lines, the author reflects on the efforts made by the nuclear negotiating team under his lead and also explains a three-faceted strategy. In chapter twelve, Achievements of 678 Days of Endeavor, the author offers a recap of all preceding chapters, and, in three sections, he deals with nuclear goals, strategies and achievements of Iran during the time he led the nuclear team.

There are seven appendices at the end of the book that include chronology of Iran's nuclear case, documents (agreements, negotiations and letters), text of resolutions, text of reports prepared by the IAEA Director-General, as well as the text of a number of press conferences and speeches by Hassan Rouhani and other high-ranking Iranian officials.

== Reception ==
National Security and Nuclear Diplomacy was presented in bookstores without any unveiling ceremony and simply after limited introduction on a few websites. Therefore, most media and critics did not know about it for a time. However, after an interview with Hassan Rouhani by Mehrnameh magazine in May 2012, the book hit the headlines not only in domestic print media, but also in their counterparts outside the country, including the BBC Persian TV, and many critiques were written about it.

== Print and publication ==
National Security and Nuclear Diplomacy was first published by the Expediency Council's Center for Strategic Research in 999 pages in fall of 2011, but was introduced and distributed in April 2012.

The second edition of the book “with corrections” was published in 1027 pages in spring of 2012. The third edition “with additional contents” came out in summer of 2012. It included the text of negotiations with the foreign ministers of three European states in Tehran and Brussels, the text of negotiations with ElBaradei, as well as the text of news conferences and speeches by Rouhani, which increased the book's size to 1209 pages.

The fourth and fifth reprints of the book came out in fall of 2012 and winter of 2013.

=== Narration of Foresight and Hope ===
Excerpts from National Security and Nuclear Diplomacy were published in March 2013, entitled Narration of Foresight and Hope, along with photos of nuclear negotiations in 552 pages.

In the preface of the book, the author has noted that in line with the old saying, “fewer words can make the point,” he had decided to print excerpts from the main book as an independent volume to be used by those readers who lack enough time to go through the original volume.

== See also ==
- Nuclear program of Iran
- Timeline of the nuclear program of Iran
- Not for the Faint of Heart
- The Pragmatic Entente
