= Center for the Great Islamic Encyclopedia =

Iranian research institute

- Abbreviation: CGIE
- Formation: 1983; 43 years ago
- Founder: Kazem Mousavi-Bojnourdi
- Type: Non-profit research organization
- Official language: Persian, Arabic, English
- Website: https://www.cgie.org.ir/en

The Center for the Great Islamic Encyclopedia (Center for Iranian and Islamic Studies) (CGIE) is an Iranian research institute with the task of researching and publishing general and topical encyclopedias about Iranian and Islamic culture. The building was nominated for the Aga Khan Award for Architecture in 2001.

== History ==
The institute was founded in 1983 by Kazem Mousavi-Bojnourdi and is located in Darabad, Tehran. Mousavi-Bojnourdi explained his motivation for founding a scientific centre on these research topics as follows:

„ The field of human civilization and culture is so vast that many of its angles have still remained undiscovered. The growth of science and knowledge in the Islamic world and other communities has created the need to gather collections containing information regarding the current knowledge as well as the definitions and jargon used in that particular field of knowledge. This need has moved some scholars to author various series of books in those fields“

The centre is directed by the High Council. Currently, the Council has four female and 50 male members.

== Research ==
The research areas of the departments include comparative literature, Arabic and Iranian literature, history of political ideas, Islamic law and philosophy, history of Islam, oriental studies, History of the ancient Iranian and other fields of research.

The Centre publishes a number of scholarly books, including the Encyclopaedia Islamica, published by Brill in English. The encyclopedia has received international attention for the knowledge of the cultural and theological development of Iranian and Islamic culture. Brill's Encyclopedia Islamica, which is edited by Farhad Daftary and Wilferd Madelung, is currently at its fifth volume. It is also published in Iran under the title Dā'erat-ol-Ma'āref-e Bozorg-e Eslāmi (Persian: دائرةالمعارف بزرگ اسلامی, "The Great Islamic Encyclopaedia") and is at the ninth letter of the Persian alphabet and its 22nd completed volume.

== Notable Researchers ==
Notable former and current scientists at The Center for the Great Islamic Encyclopedia are Dariush Shayegan, Azartash Azarnoush, Javad Tabatabai, Farhad Daftary, Wilferd Madelung, Ezzatollah Fooladvand, Katayun Mazdapour and Abbas Anvari.

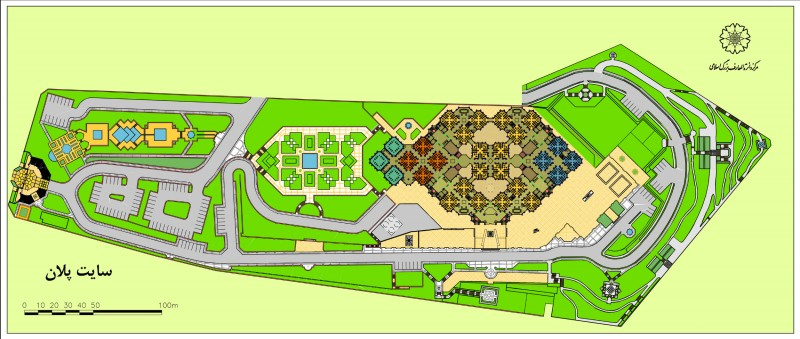
A map of the entire CGIE.

== Architecture ==
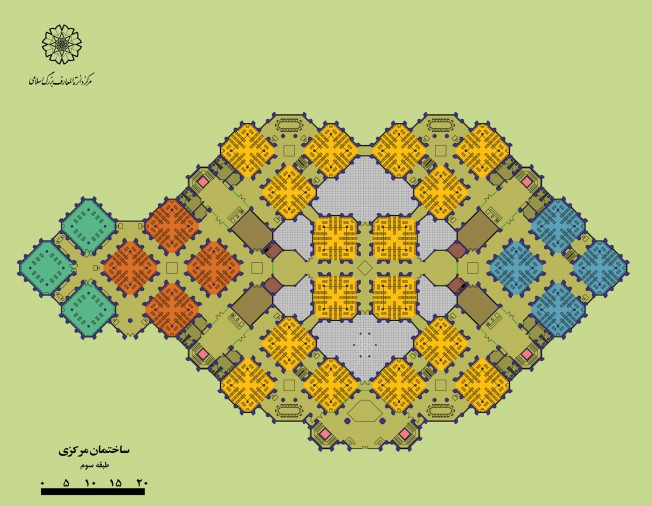
The Center for the Great Islamic Encyclopedia (Map)

The building combines traditional Iranian ornaments and construction methods with Islamic forms that are also found in important religious and spiritual sites.

== See also ==
- Encyclopaedia Islamica
- University of Tehran
