= Iran Between Two Revolutions =

1982 history book by Ervand Abrahamian

- Author: Ervand Abrahamian
- Language: English; Persian
- Subject: Iran's history, from the constitutional revolution to the 1979 revolution
- Publisher: Princeton University Press
- Publication date: 1982
- Publication place: United States
- Pages: 561
- ISBN: 978-0-691-10134-7
- Website: press.princeton.edu

Iran Between Two Revolutions is a book by Ervand Abrahamian that was published in 1982 by Princeton University Press.

== Content ==
The book was written in English based on political sociology, to analyze the social and political events of the last century in Iran. The book has been translated into Persian language and reprinted at least 30 times in Iran by different publishers.

The author examines the history of Iran from the constitutional revolution in 1905 to the Islamic revolution of 1979 and has divided the book into three main parts: historical background, anti-social politics and contemporary Iran. The main purpose of this book is to analyze the social foundations of Iran's politics, and Abrahamian does this by examining class and ethnic conflicts over the past hundred years and in the relationship between socio-economic developments and Iran's political development. According to the book, undoubtedly, the emergence of new social classes, especially the traditional middle class and the intellectual class, and the emergence of political parties and groups and the conflicts and controversies between them, has accelerated the formation of the contemporary Iran.

"Ethnic groups" and "social classes" play an effective role in contemporary Iran. In the book, the term "ethnic group" is used to mean the grouping of people based on language, tribal descent, religion or co-provinciality, and the term "social class" consists of people who have mutual relations and behavior and common in developed environments with the same economic, social and political situations. Abrahamian looks into the economic relations and political development of Iran in the last hundred years by examining the ethnic groups, social classes, parties and political groups of that time and illuminates the emergence of incomplete and immature modernity and democracy in Iran. The book "Iran Between Two Revolutions" can be divided into three parts:

1. Examining the historical contexts of developing Iran (the social contexts of the constitutional revolution and its failure to remove tyranny)
2. Investigating social forces and developments and international events in the fall of Reza Shah and the foundation of the Pahlavi II government
3. Investigating the heterogeneous and unbalanced socio-economic programs of Pahlavi II and the contexts of the emergence of the Islamic revolution of 1979

== Reception ==
A group of critics believe that the author has leftist intellectual tendencies. And he is one of the orientalists who, with a Marxist theoretical framework, aims to examine the course of social developments in Iran between the two constitutional revolution and the Islamic revolution, and it seems that with emphasizing on the economic factors, the author intended to show that the Iranian Revolution was not so Islamic. The book is based on the neo-Marxist approach of E. P. Thompson that the phenomenon of class should not be understood only in terms of its relationship with the mode of production (as ritual Marxists often believe), but on the contrary, it is necessary to examine class in the context of historical time and its social friction with other contemporary classes.

The author believes that in the last hundred years, there was never a link between the government and social structures of Iran. In other words, the constitutional government did not arise from the society, and this made the ruling groups and modern forces far apart, and the communication between the communities (the traditional middle class, mainly the clergy and marketers) and the government was cut off; Therefore, this heterogeneous development had no attraction for the Iranian society, especially the traditional middle class, and further, it led to the formation of the Islamic Revolution in Iran. Ervand Abrahamian explains that each of the actions (from the constitutional period to the Islamic revolution) marked the next developments that were exactly disproportionate to the socio-cultural conditions and the structure and body of the Iranian population. In the cities, due to the actions of the government, four classes were formed, including the Pahlavi dynasty, capitalists, the middle class (shopkeepers, employees and teachers) and the working class, which there was no plan to organize them towards the goals of development and advancement.

== See also ==
- History of the Iranian Constitutional Revolution
- The Comprehensive History of Iran
- The Cambridge History of Iran
- Encyclopædia Iranica
- Encyclopaedia Islamica
- Foucault in Iran
- Not for the Faint of Heart
- The Pragmatic Entente
