= The Cambridge History of Iran =

Late 20th-century multi-volume survey of Iranian history

- Author: William B. Fisher, Ilya Gershevitch, Ehsan Yarshater, Richard Nelson Frye, John Andrew Boyle, Peter Jackson, Laurence Lockhart, Peter Avery, Gavin Hambly, Charles P. Melville (eds.)
- Country: United Kingdom
- Language: English
- Discipline: History of Iran
- Publisher: Cambridge University Press
- Published: 1968–1989
- No. of books: 8
- OCLC: 159881392

The Cambridge History of Iran is a multi-volume survey of Iranian history published in the United Kingdom by Cambridge University Press. The seven volumes cover "the history and historical geography of the land which is present-day Iran, as well as other territories inhabited by peoples of Iranian descent, from prehistoric times up to the present.

== History ==
The publication started in 1968 and in 1989 the last volume was published. The idea of publishing such a survey of Iranian history and culture was conceived in 1959 by Arthur J. Arberry. According to the scholar Hubert Darke, who served as editorial secretary to the project between 1970 and 1993, "The series was planned to be not simply a political history of Iran but to survey the culture which has flourished in the Iranian region and this culture's contribution to the civilization of the world. All aspects of the religious, philosophical, economic, scientific, and artistic elements in Iranian civilization have been studied, but with some emphasis on the geographical and ecological factors that have contributed to its special character."

The series consists of seven volumes. Volume 3 was published in two parts.

The title, editors and the publication date of the series are

- Vol. 1. The Land of Iran, edited by William B. Fisher (1968)
- Vol. 2. The Median and Achaemenian Periods, edited by Ilya Gershevitch (1985)
- Vol. 3. The Seleucid, Parthian and Sasanian Periods, edited by Ehsan Yarshater (1983)
- Vol. 4. From the Arab invasion to the Saljuqs, edited by Richard Nelson Frye (1975)
- Vol. 5. The Saljuq and Mongol Periods, edited by John Andrew Boyle (1968)
- Vol. 6. The Timurid and Safavid Periods, edited by Laurence Lockhart and Peter Jackson (1986)
- Vol. 7. From Nadir Shah to the Islamic Republic, edited by Peter Avery, Gavin R. G. Hambly, and Charles Peter Melville (1990)

== See also ==
- Adrian David Hugh Bivar
- Daniel Schlumberger
- Encyclopaedia Iranica
- The Comprehensive History of Iran
- Iran Between Two Revolutions
- Foucault in Iran
- Iranian studies
