= Encyclopaedia Islamica =

Encyclopedia on Islamic and Iranian studies

- Cover of the book
- Language: English
- Published: Brill
- ISBN: 9789004161214

The Encyclopaedia Islamica is an encyclopedia on Islamic and Iranian studies published by Brill, comprising a projected 16-volume translation of selected articles from the new Persian Dā'erat-ol-Ma'āref-e Bozorg-e Eslāmi (Persian: دائرةالمعارف بزرگ اسلامی, "The Great Islamic Encyclopaedia"), supplemented by additional articles written in English by scholars affiliated with the Institute of Ismaili Studies.

The Persian-language project has been led by Kazem Mousavi-Bojnourdi since 1983, when the Center for the Great Islamic Encyclopedia was established in Teheran for the purpose of constituting a scientific committee to oversee its creation. The project, which provides comprehensive coverage of Shia Islam has sparked considerable interest in the Islamic world and is being consulted by many Persian-speaking scholars of Islamic studies. As of 2016, the encyclopedia is at the ninth letter of the Persian alphabet and its 22nd completed volume.

Brill's Encyclopaedia Islamica, which is edited by Farhad Daftary and Wilferd Madelung, is currently at its fifth volume. It was begun in 2008 and is expected to be completed in 2028. It is intended for advanced graduate students and scholars who require meticulous documentation.

== See also ==
- Center for the Great Islamic Encyclopedia
- The Comprehensive History of Iran
- Iran Between Two Revolutions
- Foucault in Iran
