= Al-Qaeda: Casting a Shadow of Terror =

2003 book by Jason Burke

- Author: Jason Burke
- Language: English
- Subject: Al-Qaeda
- Publisher: I. B. Tauris & Company
- Publication date: 2003
- Media type: Print
- ISBN: 1-85043-396-8

Al-Qaeda: Casting a Shadow of Terror is a 2003 book by Jason Burke about the history and goals of Osama bin Laden's Al-Qaeda and a loose amalgam of related groups. Using first-hand descriptions of terrorist camps, Burke attempts to illustrate that the west's misunderstanding of the diversity of modern Islamic militancy undermines the response to terrorism. The author asserts that the United States' focus on Al-Qaida is ultimately a waste of time, saying that the west must instead "win the hearts and minds" of the Islamic world to effectively counter terrorism.

A revised edition was published as Al-Qaeda: The True Story of Radical Islam (ISBN 1-85043-666-5).

== See also ==
- List of books about Al-Qaeda
