= The Pragmatic Entente =

1989 book by Sohrab Sobhani

The Pragmatic Entente: Israeli–Iranian Relations, 1948–1988
- Author: Sohrab Sobhani
- Language: English
- Subject: History of the relationships between Israel and Iran
- Genre: Political science; international relations; comparative politics
- Publisher: Praeger Publishing, Ketab Corp (Persian edition)
- Publication date: 1989
- Publication place: United States
- Pages: 179
- ISBN: 0275933377

The Pragmatic Entente: Israeli–Iranian Relations, 1948–1988 is the first comprehensive work on the history of long-standing yet ever-changing relationship between Israel and Iran. The book is written by Sohrab Sobhani, Iranian-American adjunct professor of International Relations at Georgetown University.

== Content ==
The author of this book, Sohrab Sobhani, has used the first-hand experiences and reports of people who were involved in the relations between Israel and Iran, before and after the arrival of Ruhollah Khomeini in Tehran in 1979. In this book, the relationship between Israel and Iran is studied in the complex background of Middle East politics. The author interviews many former Iranian officials and reveals a wealth of new information that explains why Iran and Israel act the way they do and why their interests have been intertwined for the past forty years. The book examines the main trends in the emergence of relations between the two countries of Israel and Iran and introduces the factors leading to continuity or change in these relations. In this book, by analyzing the historical events of the past, there is a discussion about how the relations between Israel and Iran will be in the future. By examining the reasons, the author shows that the Tehran-Tel Aviv connection will continue to be one of the stable features of the power configuration in the Middle East.

The book begins with a discussion of the origins of Israel-Iran relations, which were initially formed to help Iraqi Jews move to Israel. The author goes on to discuss how Iran's religious rightist have used the issue of Iran's recognition of Israel as a political tactic against the central government. Later chapters delve deeper into the Israeli–Iranian alliance against radical Arab governments, including subjects such as supporting Kurdish rebels inside Iraq and the necessity of the Arab-Israeli war in 1973. The book also introduces Britain's withdrawal from the Persian Gulf as Israel and Iran's plan to develop missiles capable of carrying nuclear warheads.

== Release ==
The book was published for the first time in 1989 in English language under the title "The Pragmatic Entente: Israeli–Iranian Relations, 1948–1988" by "Praeger" publications in New York City, United States of America. This book was translated into Persian and published in 1998 by the "Ketab Corp" publishing located in Los Angeles.

== See also ==
- Not for the Faint of Heart
- Manufactured Crisis: The Untold Story of the Iran Nuclear Scare
- Foucault in Iran
- Iran Between Two Revolutions
- Zero Days
- War on Peace
- National Security and Nuclear Diplomacy
- On the Road to Kandahar
