= War on Peace =

2018 nonfiction book

War on Peace: The End of Diplomacy and the Decline of American Influence
- First edition cover
- Author: Ronan Farrow
- Audio read by: Ronan Farrow
- Cover artist: T. Francois (art); Steve Attardo (design)
- Language: English
- Subject: Foreign policy of the United States
- Genre: Non-fiction
- Publisher: W. W. Norton & Company
- Publication date: April 24, 2018
- Publication place: United States
- Media type: Print
- Pages: 432
- ISBN: 978-0-393-65210-9 (Hardcover)
- Dewey Decimal: 327.73
- LC Class: JZ1480 .F37 2018

War on Peace: The End of Diplomacy and the Decline of American Influence is a 2018 book by American journalist Ronan Farrow, published on April 24, 2018 by W. W. Norton & Company.

== Reception ==
Publishers Weekly wrote: "Farrow doesn't quite demonstrate how diplomacy would succeed in quagmires like Afghanistan, but his indictment of the militarization of American foreign policy is persuasive."

Rosa Brooks, reviewing the book for The Washington Post, said:

Although War on Peace doesn’t fully achieve its broadest ambitions, it offers lively writing, astute commentary and plenty of great stories, laced through with passion and outrage.

== See also ==
- Not for the Faint of Heart: Lessons in Courage, Power and Persistence
- The Pragmatic Entente: Israeli-Iranian Relations, 1948-1988
