= Not for the Faint of Heart =

Memoirs of American chief negotiator "Wendy Sherman" during Iran's nuclear deal

Not for the Faint of Heart: Lessons in Courage, Power and Persistence
- First edition
- Author: Wendy Sherman
- Language: English
- Subject: Memoirs of the lead US negotiator of the historic Iran nuclear deal
- Publisher: PublicAffairs
- Publication date: September 2018
- Publication place: United States
- Pages: 256
- ISBN: 9781568588148

Not for the Faint of Heart: Lessons in Courage, Power and Persistence is a 2018 book by American diplomat Wendy Sherman based on her time as the lead United States negotiator, during the Iran nuclear deal (JCPOA).

== Content ==
The book Not for the Faint of Heart: Lessons in Courage, Power and Persistence is about the memoirs of American chief negotiator Wendy Sherman during Iran nuclear deal. The book is "a complete explanation of how the JCPOA was drafted and approved" from Wendy Sherman's point of view. The book takes the reader to the world of international diplomacy and brings their mind to the mind of one of the most effective negotiators who is often the only woman in the room. The author admits why it is difficult to do well in her field. By reading Not for the Faint of Heart, the reader will learn how to apply key diplomacy skills to their daily lives and face challenges.

In this book, Wendy Sherman has tried to tell about her experiences to overcome the obstacles faced by women not only in international diplomacy but in everyday life.

== Release ==
The book Not for the Faint of Heart: Lessons in Courage, Power and Persistence was first published originally in English language in September 2018 by PublicAffairs Books in the United States. The book was translated into Persian and published in Iran in 2019. In April 2020, this book was introduced in Iran as the best-selling book of the Islamic Revolution Document Center Publications.

== Reception ==
Madeleine Albright, the 64th Secretary of State of the United States, described Sherman's book as "A powerful, deeply personal, and absorbing book written by one of America’s smartest and most dedicated diplomats." John Kerry, the 68th Secretary of State of the United States, said that "Wendy doesn’t just write about the value of courage, power, and persistence, she lives it. She’s an example that a strong negotiator can also be a humane mentor."

== See also ==
- Manufactured Crisis: The Untold Story of the Iran Nuclear Scare
- Foucault in Iran
- Iran Between Two Revolutions
- Zero Days
- War on Peace
- National Security and Nuclear Diplomacy
- On the Road to Kandahar
- The Pragmatic Entente
