= Foucault in Iran =

Book on Michel Foucault's opinions about the Iranian revolution

Foucault in Iran: Islamic Revolution After the Enlightenment
- Author: Behrooz Ghamari-Tabrizi
- Translator: Sara Zamani (into Persian)
- Language: English
- Series: Muslim International
- Subject: Michel Foucault's opinions on the Iranian revolution
- Genre: Political science, History
- Publisher: University of Minnesota Press
- Publication date: 2016
- Publication place: United States
- Pages: 272
- ISBN: 978-0-8166-9949-0
- Website: upress.umn.edu

Foucault in Iran: Islamic Revolution After the Enlightenment is a 2016 book by Iranian-born American historian, sociologist, and professor Behrooz Ghamari-Tabrizi as a groundbreaking reassessment of Michel Foucault's writings specially on the Iranian revolution.

== Content ==
Michel Foucault, on the eve of the victory of the Iranian Islamic Revolution, traveled to Iran twice and in the eight reports he wrote for the Corriere della Sera newspaper, he showed deep sympathy with the revolutionary people of Iran and praised their Islamic revolution. Later, many French intellectuals reprimanded him for being deceived by the Iranian revolution. Foucault did not give an explicit answer to these criticisms, and it was even thought that he implicitly reversed his position in his previous writings about Iran. Little by little, these arguments were forgotten until after September 11 attacks, the previous disputes erupted again and new attacks began against Foucault and his association with the Iranian revolution. Behrooz Ghamari-Tabrizi rereads these debates in his acclaimed book Foucault in Iran and shows that not only Foucault did not give up his position, but the experience of the Iranian revolution played an important role in his intellectual evolution.

In the preface of the work, the author wrote about the reason for compiling the book: "While writing the book, many of my colleagues and critics asked: Why should what Foucault said about the Iranian revolution be important to us? Isn't he another one of those French la-di-da speaking intellectuals who have this colonial habit of prying into other nations' issues? I think these are valid questions. I have not considered this book as a commentary on Foucault's works; I found his articles on the Islamic revolution of Iran to be a wonderful window through which one can look at the revolutionary events of Iran, outside of the discourse frameworks that explain the revolutions."

== Reception ==
The book Foucault in Iran has been the subject of several reviews, including review meeting on October 12, 2020, at the National Library of Iran. Introductions have also been written on this work and the author has been interviewed. Ebrahim Towfigh (Iranian author and sociologist) said at the review meeting of the book Foucault in Iran: "The book shows that Foucault studied Islam after being involved in the Iranian revolution, and he got an image of Islam influenced by reading the works of Massignon and Corbin, and in a sense especially the works of Shariati, it means a mystical reading of Islam." So far, many reviews have been written by the Iranian media on the book Foucault in Iran.

== See also ==
- Michel Foucault bibliography
- Iran Between Two Revolutions
- History of the Iranian Constitutional Revolution
- The Comprehensive History of Iran
- The Cambridge History of Iran
- Encyclopædia Iranica
- Encyclopaedia Islamica
- Not for the Faint of Heart
- The Pragmatic Entente
