= Laurence Lockhart =

British Scholar (1890–1975)

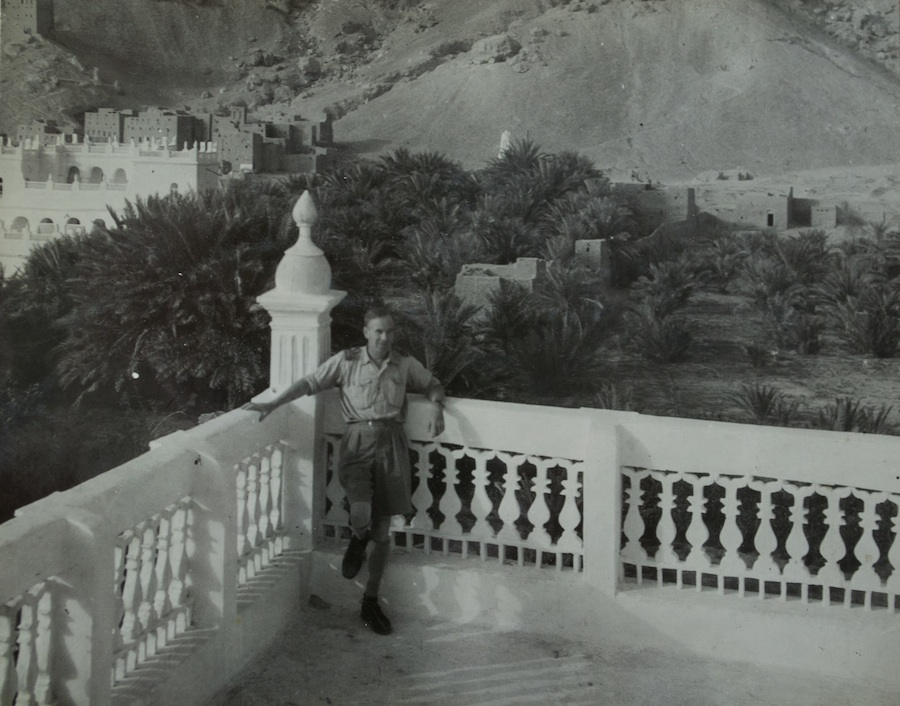
Photograph of Laurence Lockhart

Laurence Lockhart (1890–1975) was a British scholar, who specialized in Iranian history. He was born on 9 July 1890 in London and died on 3 May 1975 in Cambridge.

Lockhart was involved in academic research throughout his commercial career and even after retirement, despite never having held an official post at a university. Nadir Shah: A Critical Study Based Mainly upon Contemporary Sources (1938) and The Fall of the Ṣafavi Dynasty (1958) are two of his most significant publications and are still considered fundamental monographs in Iranian studies.

== Sources ==
- Tucker, Ernest (2000). "Lockhart, Laurence". Encyclopaedia Iranica.
