= Kazem Mousavi-Bojnourdi =

Iranian historian, theologian and writer (born 1942)

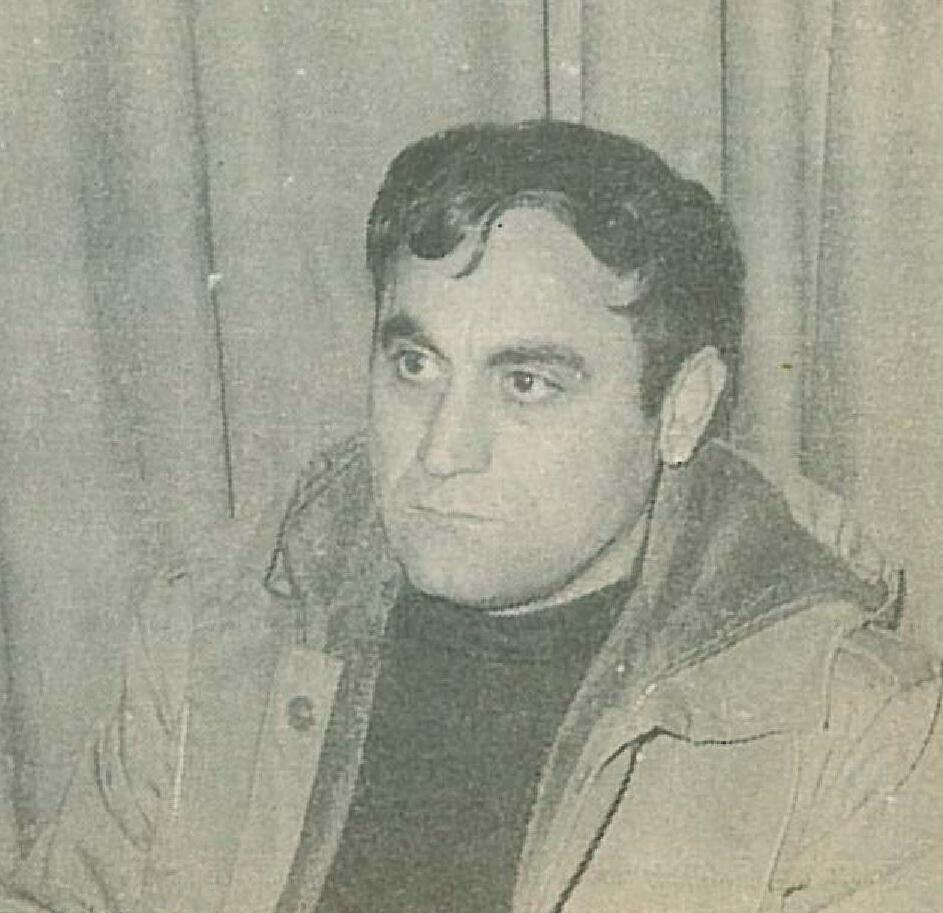
Mohammad-Kazem Mousavi-Bojnourdi in 1980

Seyyed Mohammad-Kazem Mousavi-Bojnourdi (Persian: سید محمدکاظم موسوی بجنوردی; born 22 May 1942 in Najaf, Iraq) is an Iranian historian, theologian and writer.

He was the curator of the National Library of Iran from 1997 to 2005 and founder of Center for the Great Islamic Encyclopedia which is a Tehran-based research institute on Iranian and Islamic culture.
