= Encyclopædia Iranica =

Encyclopedia about the history, culture, and civilization of Iranian peoples

- Encyclopædia Iranica Volume XVI
- Author: 1300 named contributors
- Language: English
- Subject: Iranistics and Greater Iran studies
- Genre: Reference encyclopedia
- Publisher: Encyclopædia Iranica Foundation, Brill Academic Publishers
- Publication date: 1985–present
- Publication place: United States
- Media type: 45 hardback volumes planned; 16 volumes or 15 volumes and 6 fascicles as of October 2020.
- Dewey Decimal: 955.00321
- LC Class: DS253 .E53 1983
- Website: iranicaonline.org

Encyclopædia Iranica is a project whose goal is to create a comprehensive and authoritative English-language encyclopedia about the history, culture, and civilization of Iranian peoples from prehistory to modern times.

== Scope ==
The Encyclopædia Iranica is dedicated to the study of Iranian civilization in the wider Middle East, the Caucasus, Southeastern Europe, Central Asia, and the Indian subcontinent. The academic reference work will eventually cover all aspects of Iranian history and culture as well as all Iranian languages and literatures, facilitating the whole range of Iranian studies research from archeology to political sciences. It is a project founded by Ehsan Yarshater in 1973 and currently carried out at Columbia University's Center for Iranian Studies. It is considered the standard encyclopedia of the academic discipline of Iranistics.

The scope of the encyclopedia goes beyond modern Iran (also known formerly in the Western world as "Persia") and encompasses the entire Iranian cultural sphere, and far beyond. Relations of the Iranian world with other cultures (China, European countries, etc.) are also covered. The project is planning on publishing a total of up to 45 volumes.

== Organization ==
=== Staff ===
Ehsan Yarshater was the founding editor of Encyclopædia Iranica from 1973 through 2017. The current editor-in-chief is Elton Daniel. The editorial board includes Mohsen Ashtiany, Mahnaz Moazami, and over 40 consulting editors from major international institutions doing research in Iranian studies. Former long tenured editors include Ahmad Ashraf, Christopher Brunner, Habib Borjian, Kioumars Ghereghlou, Manuchehr Kasheff, Dagmar Riedel and Houra Yavari. A growing number (over 1,300 in 2016) of scholars worldwide have contributed articles to Encyclopædia Iranica.

=== Encyclopædia Iranica Foundation ===
In 1990, Ehsan Yarshater established the Encyclopædia Iranica Foundation (EIF), which serves to promote the cause of the Encyclopædia Iranica and to ensure its continuation. Over the years, Columbia University's Center for Iranian Studies (also founded by Yarshater) continued to coordinate and edit the Encyclopædia, while the EIF substantially sponsored the work.

The foundation provides the full text of many entries (up to fascicle XVI/3) for free on the iranicaonline.org website.

=== Legal dispute ===
Following Yarshater's retirement as director of the Center for Iranian Studies in 2016, a dispute began to emerge between Columbia University and the EIF as Columbia unilaterally decided to enter into a contract with Brill, an academic publisher, which subsequently published fascicles 4 and 5 of volume XVI in 2018 and 2019; the EIF protested the move. In 2019, Columbia University sued the EIF, seeking, among other things, a finding that the EIF owns neither a copyright nor an exclusive trademark right in the encyclopedia. EIF countersued alleging that Columbia, as well as Brill and Elton Daniel, breached EIF's copyright in the encyclopedia, infringed, diluted, and counterfeited its trademarks, converted EIF property, and committed various acts of unjust enrichment and unfair competition. On July 31, 2020, the U.S. District Court in the Southern District of New York granted a temporary restraining order against Columbia, Brill and Daniel, enjoining them through October 8, 2020 from publishing additional fascicles. EIF also sought a preliminary injunction against the defendants, but such relief was not entered by the court. Columbia and Brill subsequently published fascicle XVI/6 on October 19, 2020.

As part of the dispute, there are now conflicting accounts as to the current state of the Encyclopædia Iranica. While Columbia has published fascicle XVI/4 through XVI/6, covering topics between "Kešaʾi Dialect" and "Khorasan XIV", by EIF's count volume XVI only covers topics falling alphabetically between KA and KE. EIF considers fascicles XVI/4 through XVI/6 "counterfeit fascicles".

On June 1, 2023 the Encyclopædia Iranica Foundation and Columbia University settled their lawsuit with undisclosed terms.

== Reception ==
In a review of Volume III, Richard W. Bulliet calls Encyclopædia Iranica "not just a necessity for Iranists [but] of inestimable value for everyone concerned with the history and culture of the Middle East". Ali Banuazizi, though, notes that its focus is on Iran "as perceived, analyzed, and described by its most distinguished, mainly Western, students". In 1998, the journal Iranian Studies devoted a double issue (vol. 31, no. 3/4) to reviews of the encyclopedia, coming to 700 pages by 29 authors on as many subjects. Professor A. Banuazizi, praised that the encyclopaedia "will be judged as the most significant contribution of our century to the advancement of Iranian studies as a scholarly enterprise".

Many foundations, organizations, and individuals have supported Encyclopædia Iranica. The encyclopaedia has been sponsored since 1979 by the National Endowment for the Humanities, as well as the American Council of Learned Societies, Union Académique Internationale, Iran Heritage Foundation, and many other charitable foundations, philanthropic families and individuals.

On March 25, 2007, the Associated Press released a news report about Encyclopædia Iranica, claiming that it is "U.S.-backed". Encyclopædia Iranica published an official response, saying the report was "inaccurate and libelous", that while the National Endowment for the Humanities supports the encyclopedia, the Endowment is "an independent federal agency whose many projects are reviewed and decided upon by independent panels of scholars", not the U.S. Government, and that only a third of the encyclopedia's budget is supplied by the Endowment, not half, as the Associated Press had claimed.

== Volumes ==
As of July 2015, the online version of the Encyclopædia Iranica has almost 7,300 entries, of which about 1,100 entries are only available on the Internet. The following is a list of printed volumes, current as of October 2020.

Beginning and ending entries	Publication year	Volume number	ISBN
ĀB – ANĀHID	1985	I	
ANĀMAKA – ĀṮĀR AL-WOZARĀʾ	1987	II	
ĀTAŠ – BEYHAQI	1989	III	
BĀYJU – CARPETS	1990	IV	
CARPETS – COFFEE	1992	V	
COFFEEHOUSE – DĀRĀ	1993	VI	
DĀRĀ(B) – EBN AL-AṮIR	1996	VII	
EBN ʿAYYĀŠ – EʿTEŻĀD-AL-SALṬANA	1998	VIII	
ETHÉ – FISH	1999	IX	
FISHERIES – GINDAROS	2001	X	
GIŌNI – HAREM I	2003	XI	
HAREM I – ILLUMINATIONISM	2004	XII	
ILLUMINATIONISM – ISFAHAN VIII	2006	XIII	
ISFAHAN IX – JOBBĀʾI	2008	XIV	
JOČI – KAŠḠARI, SAʿD-AL-DIN	2011	XV	

In addition, the following fascicles of volume XVI have been published:

- Fascicle 1 (KASHAN – KAŠŠI, ABU ʿAMR MOḤAMMAD), 2012
- Fascicle 2 (KAŠŠI, ABU ʿAMR MOḤAMMAD – KÉGL, SÁNDOR), 2013
- Fascicle 3 (KÉGL, SÁNDOR – KEŠAʾI Dialect), 2013
- Fascicle 4 (Kešaʾi Dialect – Khavaran-Nama), 2018 (Note: Not recognized by the Encyclopædia Iranica Foundation, see § Legal dispute.)
- Fascicle 5 (Khavaran-Nama – Khomeini), 2019
- Fascicle 6 (Khomeini – Khorasan XIV), 2020

== See also ==
- Academy of Persian Language and Literature
- The Comprehensive History of Iran
- Dastur al-Muluk
- Foucault in Iran
- Iran Between Two Revolutions
- Iranian studies
- List of online encyclopedias
