= Nuclear latency =

State ability to develop nuclear weapons

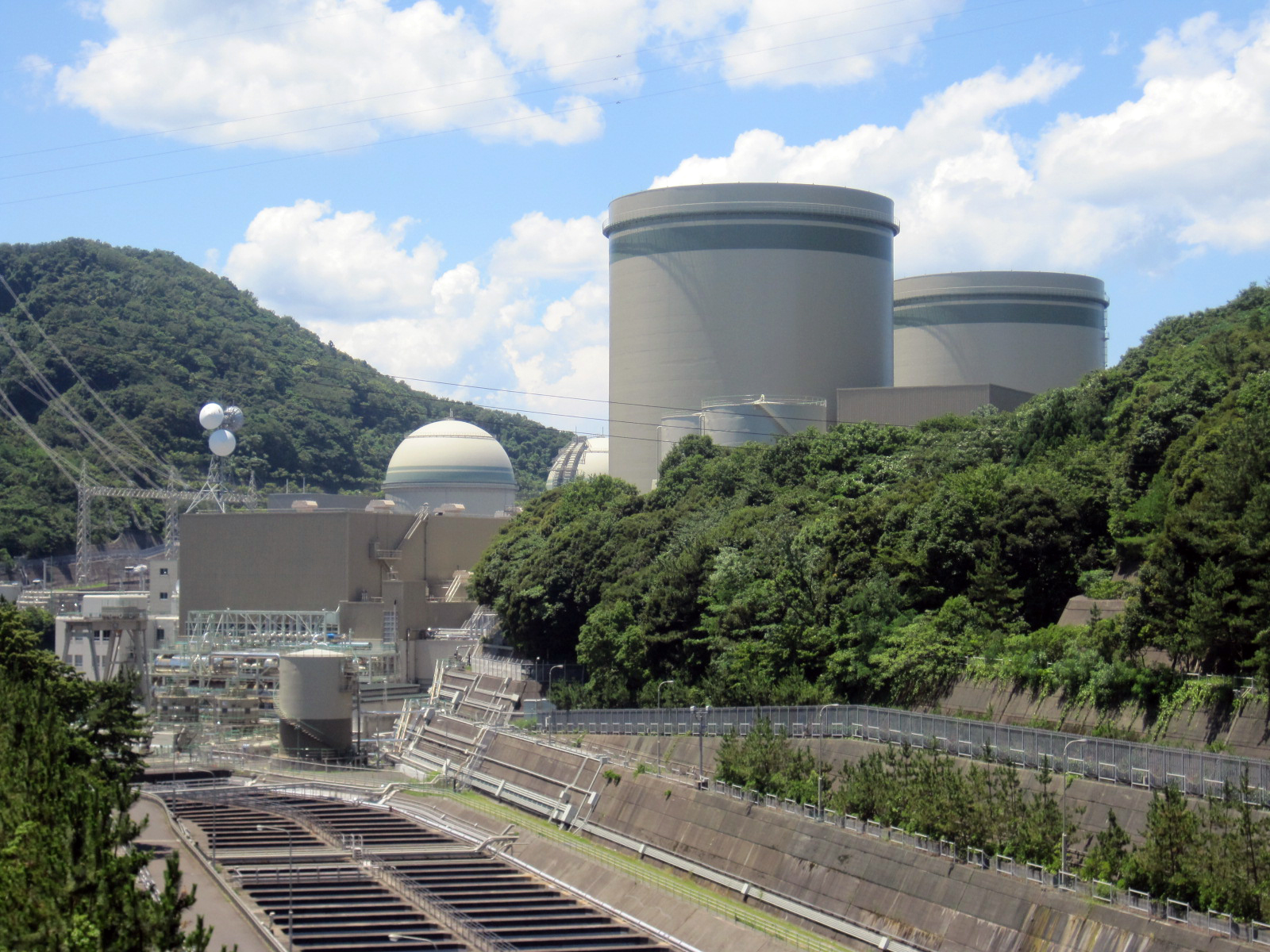
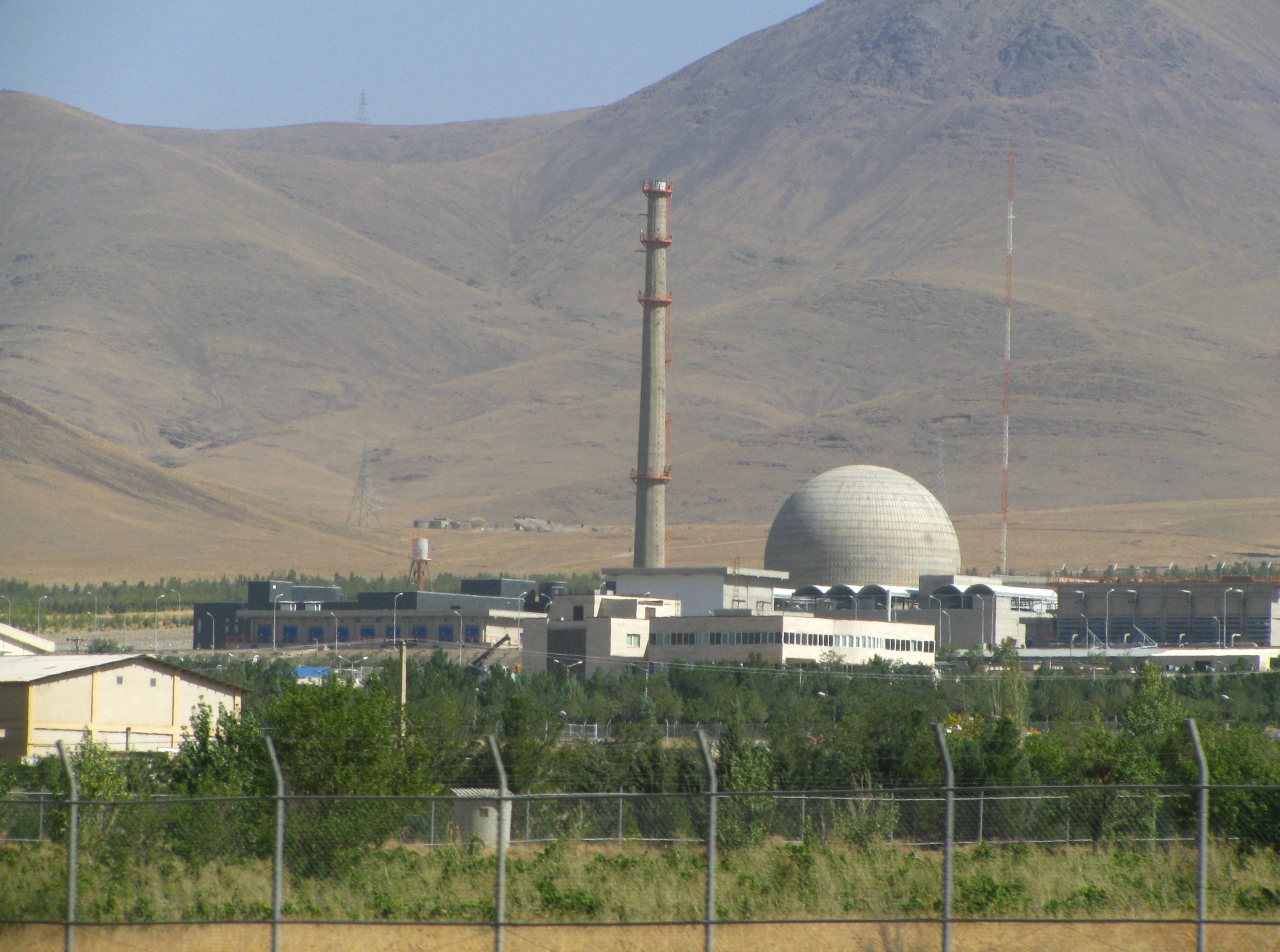
Takahama Nuclear Power Plant in Takahama, Japan and the former Khondab Heavy Water Research Reactor in Arak, Iran

Nuclear latency or a nuclear threshold state is the condition of a country possessing all the expertise, infrastructure, technology, and personnel needed to quickly develop nuclear weapons, without having actually yet done so.

== Nuclear hedging ==
Nuclear latency can be achieved with solely peaceful intentions, but in some cases nuclear latency is achieved in order to be able to create nuclear arms in the future, which is known as "nuclear hedging". While states engaging in nuclear hedging do not directly violate the NPT, they do run the risk of potentially encouraging their neighboring states, particularly those they have had conflicts with, to do the same, spawning a "virtual" arms race to ensure the potential of future nuclear capability. Such a situation could rapidly escalate into an actual arms race, drastically raising tensions in the region and increasing the risk of a potential nuclear exchange.

=== Determining peacefulness of a nuclear program ===
In a paper written following the establishment of the JCPOA, a Counselor of the Nuclear Threat Initiative, John Carlson, outlined several criteria for use in helping to determine whether a state's nuclear program was run solely with peaceful intentions, or if the state was engaging in nuclear hedging:

1. Production of nuclear materials significantly beyond what could feasibly be needed in order to maintain a state's current nuclear reactors. This includes both the processes of the enrichment of uranium and the reprocessing of plutonium.
2. Retaining stores of nuclear materials which can be used in weapons construction beyond the amount that could reasonably be slated for use in civilian purposes, such as research or power generation.
3. Noncompliance or lack of proper cooperation with the IAEA, or grievous disregard for reasonable safeguards.
4. Construction of facilities and infrastructure which is more reasonably oriented toward the production of nuclear weapons than for civil purposes, such as reactors that produce extremely large quantities of plutonium.
5. Production of technologies which are primarily oriented toward the creation of nuclear weapons, such as the explosive lenses required to build an implosion-type weapon.
6. Production or development of systems designed to allow for the delivery of nuclear payloads, such as long-range ballistic missiles.
7. A supposedly civilian nuclear energy program having heavy involvement with the state's military, an indication that the state's military is likely seeking to obtain nuclear materials.
8. Making use of black market sources in order to obtain nuclear materials, technology used for reprocessing or enrichment, technology used in the production of nuclear arms or delivery systems, or the purchase of nuclear delivery systems outright.
9. The state being in a location in which it has a history of severe conflicts in its relationships with several neighboring states. This gives the state a reason to desire nuclear arms as a potential deterrence of its neighboring adversaries.

== Nuclear-threshold states ==
Japan is considered a "paranuclear" state, with complete technical prowess to develop a nuclear weapon quickly, and is sometimes called being "one screwdriver's turn" from the bomb, as it is considered to have the materials and technical capacity to make a nuclear weapon at will.

Iran is also considered a nuclear threshold state, with its advanced nuclear program capable of producing fissile material for a bomb in a matter of days if weaponized. In the 21st century, many Western and Israeli politicians have argued for a more hawkish position on Iran's nuclear latency, stating "Iran can never have a nuclear weapon". Ahmad Bakhshayesh Ardestani, a member of the Iranian Parliament's National Security and Foreign Policy Committee ordered developing nuclear weapons.

Other nuclear threshold states are Canada, Germany, the Netherlands, Brazil and Argentina.

South Africa has successfully developed its own nuclear weapons, but dismantled them in 1989. Taiwan and South Korea have both been identified as "insecure" nuclear threshold states—states with the technical capability to develop nuclear weapons and the security motivations to seriously contemplate such an option—since the publishing of a Mitre Corporation report in 1977. South Korea had been involved in nuclear energy technology since the end of the Korean War, and possessed an active nuclear weapons program that was terminated in the mid-1970s with its signing of the Nuclear Non-Proliferation Treaty, while still engaging in some clandestine nuclear weapons research into the late 1980s. In the late 1970s the US intelligence community believed Taiwan had designed devices suitable for nuclear testing.

The number of states that are technically nuclear-latent has steadily increased as nuclear energy and its requisite technologies have become more available, but the number of states that are actually at the threshold status is limited. Nuclear latency does not presume any particular intentions on the part of a state recognized as being nuclear-latent.

== See also ==
- Australia and weapons of mass destruction

== Additional resources ==
For more on the proliferation and debates surrounding nuclear weapons and their latency, visit the Woodrow Wilson Center's Nuclear Proliferation International History Project website: Nuclear Proliferation International History Project | Wilson Center.
