= Nuclear program of Iran =

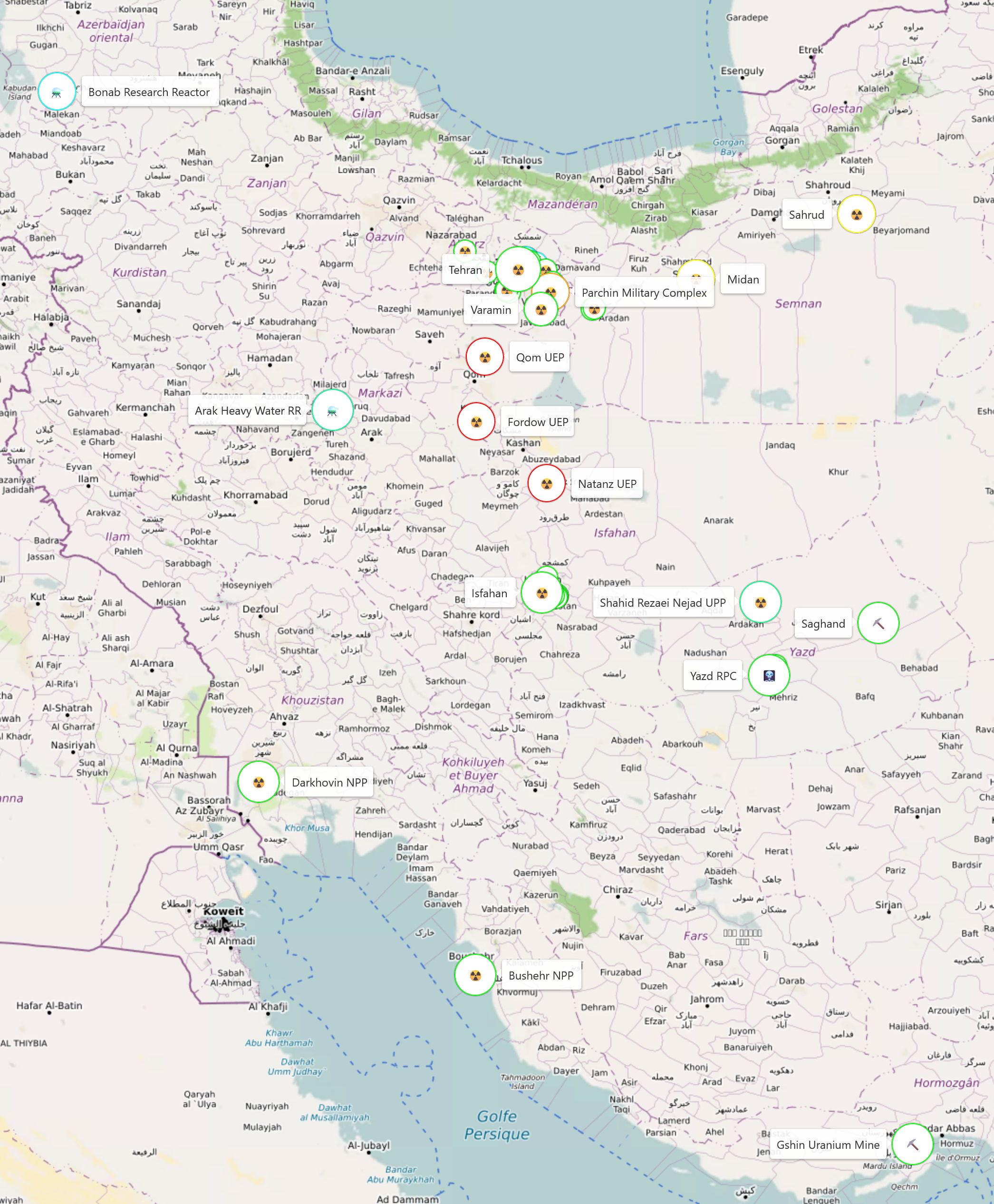
Map of reported nuclear-related sites in Iran

The nuclear program of Iran consists of an extensive infrastructure of research sites, uranium mines, research reactors, uranium processing facilities, enrichment sites, the Bushehr Nuclear Power Plant (the country’s sole operational power reactor, currently expanding with two additional units), and the developing Darkhovin Nuclear Power Plant in Khuzestan. The program’s research capabilities are anchored by several facilities, most notably the Tehran Research Reactor and the heavy water reactor at Khondab. Iran's uranium processing infrastructure is centered in Isfahan, which serves as a hub for conversion and fuel fabrication, while primary enrichment activities are conducted at Natanz, Fordow, and within the Isfahan complex.

Iran’s stated objective is a self-sufficient nuclear energy cycle to diversify its power grid and produce medical radioisotopes, citing a legal right to peaceful technology under the Non-Proliferation Treaty (NPT). While viewed as a cornerstone of Iranian technological nationalism, the program has been the subject of a decades-long diplomatic and military standoff, particularly with the United States and Israel, culminating in large-scale conflicts in 2025 and 2026.

The program began in 1957 as part of the US-led Atoms for Peace initiative and expanded significantly during the 1970s under the Pahlavi era, which saw the start of the Bushehr project with Western assistance. Following the 1979 Iranian Revolution, the program was initially deprioritized but was revived in the late 1980s.

During the 1990s and early 2000s, Iran developed several undeclared sites, which were identified by international observers in 2002 and 2009. Following the collapse of negotiations with the EU-3 in 2005, the International Atomic Energy Agency (IAEA) Board of Governors found Iran in non-compliance with its NPT safeguards agreement, leading the United Nations Security Council (UNSC) to pass a series of resolutions between 2006 and 2010 demanding a suspension of Iran's enrichment-related activities and targeting Iran’s banking, trade, and energy sectors. While Western intelligence agencies assessed that a dedicated weaponization project, the AMAD Project, was discontinued in 2003, Iran's ongoing enrichment activities led to a decades-long cycle of international sanctions and a sustained campaign of covert sabotage, including the 2009 Stuxnet cyberattack, multiple assassinations of Iranian nuclear scientists, and strikes on facilities in 2020 and 2021, which Iran characterized as "nuclear terrorism."

In 2015, the Joint Comprehensive Plan of Action (JCPOA) was signed by Iran, China, France, Russia, the United Kingdom, the US, and Germany, under which Iran agreed to strict enrichment limits and extensive international monitoring at its nuclear facilities in exchange for sanctions relief. Although the JCPOA briefly stabilized the situation, this period of oversight ended in 2018 following the unilateral withdrawal of the United States and the subsequent "Maximum Pressure" campaign. In response to the US withdrawal, and citing ongoing acts of US and Israeli sabotage, Iran incrementally reduced its compliance and raised enrichment levels to 60%, (Note: Uranium is considered weapons-grade at 90% enrichment.) a move the Iranian government characterized as diplomatic leverage to secure the removal of reinstated sanctions. In August 2025, France, Germany, and the UK triggered the snapback mechanism, reinstating UN sanctions; that October, Iran, Russia, and China declared they viewed JCPOA terminated and the UN sanctions legally void.

The standoff escalated into direct military conflict with the Twelve-Day War in June 2025 and a larger joint U.S.-Israeli campaign in February 2026 targeting nuclear and ballistic missile infrastructure. These strikes, which included the assassination of high-ranking Iranian officials, were justified by the U.S. and Israel as preemptive measures to prevent a nuclear breakout. Following a Pakistan-mediated ceasefire in April 2026, the parties entered high-level negotiations in Islamabad. However, a lasting settlement remains elusive; while the U.S. has demanded a permanent end to all uranium enrichment, Iran maintains its legal right to a civilian program. Analysts remain divided on the long-term impact of the conflict, debating whether the physical damage has permanently delayed the program or instead incentivized a transition from nuclear latency to the pursuit of a completed deterrent.

== History ==
=== Origins under the Shah (1950s–1970s) ===
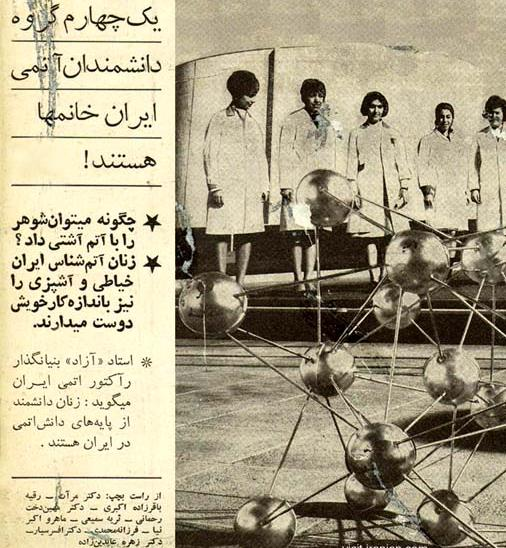
An Iranian newspaper clip from 1968 reads: "A quarter of Iran's nuclear energy scientists are women." The photograph shows some female Iranian PhDs posing in front of Tehran's research reactor.

Iran's nuclear program began under the rule of Shah Mohammad Reza Pahlavi, with support from the United States and Western Europe. In 1957, Iran and the US signed a civil nuclear cooperation agreement as part of President Dwight Eisenhower's Atoms for Peace program, leading to the construction of Iran's first nuclear research facility Tehran. In November 1967, the Tehran Research Reactor (TRR)—a 5 megawatt thermal light-water reactor—went critical, initially fueled with 93% highly enriched uranium (HEU) provided by the US. Iran became one of the original signatories of the NPT when it entered into force in March 1970, committing as a non-nuclear-weapon state not to pursue nuclear arms.

By the mid-1970s, the Shah expanded the program, citing the need for "alternative sources of fuel for the day when the oil reserves would be depleted." In 1974 he established the Atomic Energy Organization of Iran (AEOI) and announced plans to produce 23,000 megawatts of electricity from a network of nuclear power plants over 20 years. Contracts were signed with Western firms: Iran paid over $1 billion for a 10% stake in the French Eurodif consortium's uranium enrichment plant, and West Germany's Kraftwerk Union agreed to build two 1,200 MWe pressurized water reactors at Bushehr. Construction of the Bushehr Nuclear Power Plant began in 1975, and Iran also negotiated with France's Framatome to supply additional reactors. Plans were made for a full domestic nuclear fuel cycle, including uranium mining and fuel fabrication, with a new Nuclear Technology Center established at Isfahan.

=== Post-revolution revival and war impact (1979–1980s) ===
This ambitious program slowed dramatically after the 1979 Islamic Revolution. The Shah was deposed and Iran's new leaders under Ayatollah Ruhollah Khomeini were initially hostile to nuclear technology, seeing it as a symbol of Western influence. Many ongoing nuclear projects were shelved or canceled. The Iran–Iraq War (1980–1988) derailed the nuclear program: resources were diverted to the war effort, and Iraq targeted Iran's nuclear infrastructure. The partially built Bushehr reactor site was bombed multiple times by Iraqi warplanes, and Siemens withdrew from the project, leaving the reactor shells heavily damaged. By the late 1980s, Iran's nuclear program had effectively been put on hold.

=== Secret expansion and weaponization efforts (1990s–2002) ===
By the early 1990s, Iran's nuclear program accelerated on two parallel tracks: one overtly civilian and one covert. Openly, Iran continued working with Russia and China to build peaceful nuclear infrastructure. Bushehr's reactor project moved forward under Russian engineers (though plagued by delays until it finally came online in 2011), and China helped Iran with nuclear research and uranium mining expertise. Less transparently, Iran was building a secret enrichment capability and exploring technologies relevant to nuclear weapons, away from the eyes of inspectors.

Iran's covert procurement of enrichment technology bore fruit in the 1990s. Thousands of centrifuge components, tools, and technical drawings obtained from A.Q. Khan and the proliferation network were used to set up secret pilot enrichment workshops. Experiments with uranium hexafluoride gas were conducted in undeclared facilities in Tehran (such as the Kalaye Electric Company) in the late 1990s. In 2000, Iran completed a uranium conversion plant at Isfahan, based on a Chinese design, to produce uranium hexafluoride feedstock for enrichment. It also developed domestic sources of uranium: the Saghand mine in Yazd province (with Chinese assistance) and the Gchine mine and mill near the Gulf coast. The Gchine uranium mine became operational in 2004 and is now believed to have originally been part of a military-run nuclear effort, kept hidden from the IAEA until revealed in 2003. These steps gave Iran independent access to the raw materials and precursor processes for a weapons-capable nuclear fuel cycle.

In the late 1990s Iran launched a nuclear weapons research program, codenamed the AMAD Project, under the aegis of the Iranian Ministry of Defense. According to later IAEA findings, the AMAD Project (led by Mohsen Fakhrizadeh, a top nuclear scientist) aimed to design and build an arsenal of five nuclear warheads by the mid-2000s. Between 1999 and 2003, this secret program managed to illegally acquire warhead design (reportedly and possibly including an engineered Pakistan design from KRL– although Pakistan disputed this claim), conducting high-explosive tests and detonator development for an implosion-type bomb, manufacturing some nuclear weapon components with surrogate materials, and integrating a warhead design into Iran's Shahab-3 ballistic missile system. The main thing Amad lacked was fissile material, since Iran had not yet produced weapons-grade uranium or plutonium for a bomb core. Still, the scope of Amad demonstrated that Iran was exploring the bomb option in violation of its NPT obligations.

Throughout the 1990s, Iranian entities also received steady assistance from foreign sources. Some Russian and Chinese companies provided Iran with expertise and equipment for its nuclear program. For example, Chinese technicians conducted uranium exploration in Iran and allegedly supplied blueprints that aided Iran's construction of the Isfahan conversion facility. Iranians also gained know-how through Pakistan's academic exhanges (later becoming a loggerhead issue between Pakistan and the United States), and from academic exchanges abroad. That enabled Iran to secretly establish the critical facilities that could produce weapons-usable material: large uranium enrichment plants and a heavy-water reactor project.

By the early 2000s, two key clandestine facilities were nearing completion: a uranium enrichment center at Natanz (in central Iran), built to house thousands of centrifuges, and a heavy water production plant alongside a 40 MW heavy-water reactor (IR-40) near Arak. These facilities, which had been kept secret from the IAEA, were intended for ostensibly civilian purposes but had clear weapons potential. Enrichment at Natanz could yield high-enriched uranium for bombs, while the Arak reactor (once operational) could produce plutonium in its spent fuel, and the heavy water plant would supply the reactor's coolant. In August 2002, an exiled Iranian opposition group, the National Council of Resistance of Iran (NCRI), exposed the existence of Natanz and Arak. Satellite imagery soon confirmed construction at these sites. The revelation that Iran had built major nuclear facilities in secret, without required disclosure to the IAEA, ignited an international crisis and raised questions about the program's true aim.

=== Exposure and International Confrontation (2002–2013) ===
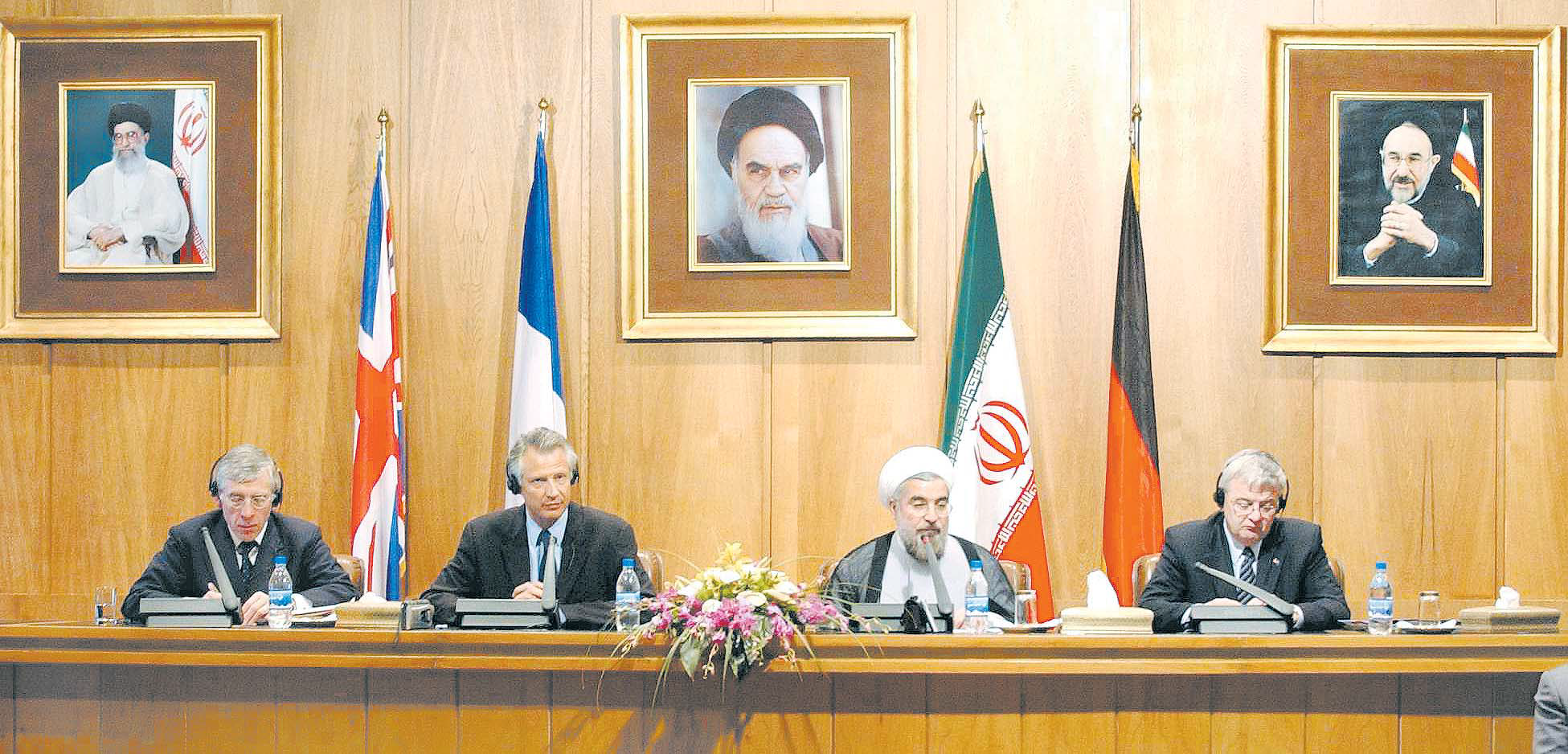
The Tehran Declaration on 21 October 2003, from right to left: Joschka Fischer, Hassan Rouhani, Dominique de Villepin and Jack Straw.

In late 2003, Iran was facing the prospect of censure and agreed to a degree of cooperation. In October 2003, Iran and the foreign ministers of Britain, France, and Germany (the "EU-3") struck the Tehran Agreement: Iran pledged to temporarily suspend all uranium enrichment and reprocessing activities, allow more intrusive inspections by signing the Additional Protocol, and clarify past nuclear work. This deal, reached just ahead of an IAEA Board of Governors deadline, was intended to build confidence while a longer-term solution was negotiated. However, Iran's cooperation was halting and incomplete.

In 2004 and 2005, the IAEA uncovered inconsistencies and omissions in Iran's disclosures, such as experiments with plutonium separation and advanced P-2 centrifuge designs that Iran had failed to report. Iran's suspension of enrichment proved short-lived as soon it resumed certain nuclear activities. In June 2004, the IAEA's Board rebuked Iran for not fully cooperating. By September 2005, the Board found Iran in non-compliance with its safeguards (a formal trigger for UN Security Council involvement). Iran reacted by ceasing voluntary implementation of the Additional Protocol and restarting enrichment work. In April 2006, President Mahmoud Ahmadinejad announced that Iran had enriched uranium to 3.5% U-235, low enriched uranium suitable for nuclear fuel, using a cascade of 164 centrifuges at Natanz. This marked Iran's first public entry into the nuclear fuel-cycle capability club.

The international community responded firmly. In July 2006, the UN Security Council passed Resolution 1696 under Chapter VII, demanding Iran suspend all enrichment-related activities or face sanctions. When Iran defied this demand, the Security Council proceeded to adopt a series of escalating sanctions between 2006 and 2010. The first, Resolution 1737 in December 2006, imposed sanctions targeting sensitive nuclear and missile programs and banned nuclear-related trade with Iran. Further resolutions (1747 in 2007, 1803 in 2008, and 1929 in June 2010) broadened the sanctions to include arms embargoes, asset freezes on key individuals and entities, and restrictions on financial dealings. These measures, backed by the US, Russia, China, and the EU alike, aimed to pressure Iran to halt enrichment. In parallel, the US and EU introduced their own sanctions, including US laws penalizing Iran's oil and gas investment (e.g. the Iran Sanctions Act of 1996) and European moves to restrict trade and eventually embargo Iranian oil by 2012.

Diplomatic efforts during 2005–2006 tried to resolve the standoff. The newly formed P5+1 group (China, Russia, France, the UK, the US, plus Germany) offered Iran a package of incentives in mid-2006 to halt enrichment – including nuclear fuel guarantees and economic benefits. Iran, under the hardline Ahmadinejad administration, rejected the offer, insisting on its "right" to enrich under the NPT. As talks faltered, Iran steadily expanded its enrichment work. By 2007, Iran had installed roughly 3,000 IR-1 centrifuges at Natanz and was enriching larger quantities of uranium. In 2007, a US National Intelligence Estimate (NIE) assessed with high confidence that while Iran had halted its structured nuclear weapons program in 2003, it was continuing to develop technical capabilities applicable to nuclear weapons. This finding somewhat tempered the urgency of the crisis, but concerns remained over Iran's growing stockpile of enriched uranium and its long-term intentions.

==== Secret enrichment site ====
A significant development came in September 2009, when Western leaders exposed yet another secret Iranian facility. US President Barack Obama, joined by France's Nicolas Sarkozy and Britain's Gordon Brown, revealed intelligence on the Fordow Fuel Enrichment Plant, an underground enrichment site being built deep inside a mountain near Qom. Iran had not declared Fordow to the IAEA, violating its safeguards duty to report new facilities at the planning stage.

Fordow's secret construction (begun in 2006) and fortified location heightened fears that Iran sought a secret bomb program resilient to military attack. Iran defended Fordow as a backup enrichment plant and belatedly declared it to the IAEA, but confidence in Iran's transparency was further eroded. The Fordow revelation galvanized international unity for tougher sanctions, manifested in Resolution 1929 (June 2010), which severely tightened economic restrictions on Iran.

Meanwhile, covert operations also targeted the program. The Stuxnet cyberattack, a sophisticated computer worm widely attributed to the US and Israel, was discovered in 2010 after it disrupted the control systems at Natanz, crippling a large number of Iran's spinning centrifuges. Between 2010 and 2012, four Iranian nuclear scientists were assassinated in Tehran, killings Iran blamed on Israeli and Western agents.

By mid-2013, Tehran had installed over 18,000 centrifuges (mostly IR-1 models) at Natanz and Fordow, including some 1,000+ more advanced IR-2m machine. Its stockpile had grown to nearly 10,000 kg of 3.5% low-enriched uranium and about 370 kg of 20% medium-enriched uranium – the latter quantity almost enough, if further enriched to weapons-grade, for one nuclear bomb. The world's concern was that Iran's "breakout" time, i.e. the time to produce bomb-grade uranium for a weapon, had shrunk to a matter of a few months.

=== Diplomatic efforts and the JCPOA (2013–2018) ===
In 2013, Iran's newly elected president, Hassan Rouhani, a centrist cleric and former nuclear negotiator, campaigned on ending sanctions through diplomacy. He had cautious backing from Supreme Leader Ali Khamenei. Meanwhile, US President Barack Obama, having already authorized secret backchannel talks with Iranian officials in Oman in 2012, was open to a diplomatic solution. Formal multilateral negotiations resumed in October 2013 between Iran and the P5+1. By November 24, they reached the Joint Plan of Action (JPOA), an interim agreement that froze key elements of Iran's nuclear program in exchange for limited sanctions relief. Iran halted enrichment above 5% U-235, neutralized its 20% stockpile through dilution or conversion, suspended centrifuge installation, and agreed not to fuel or operate the Arak heavy-water reactor. In return, it received access to about $4.2 billion in frozen assets and limited relief on petrochemical and precious metals trade. The JPOA, which began in January 2014, was extended several times while talks continued toward a final accord.

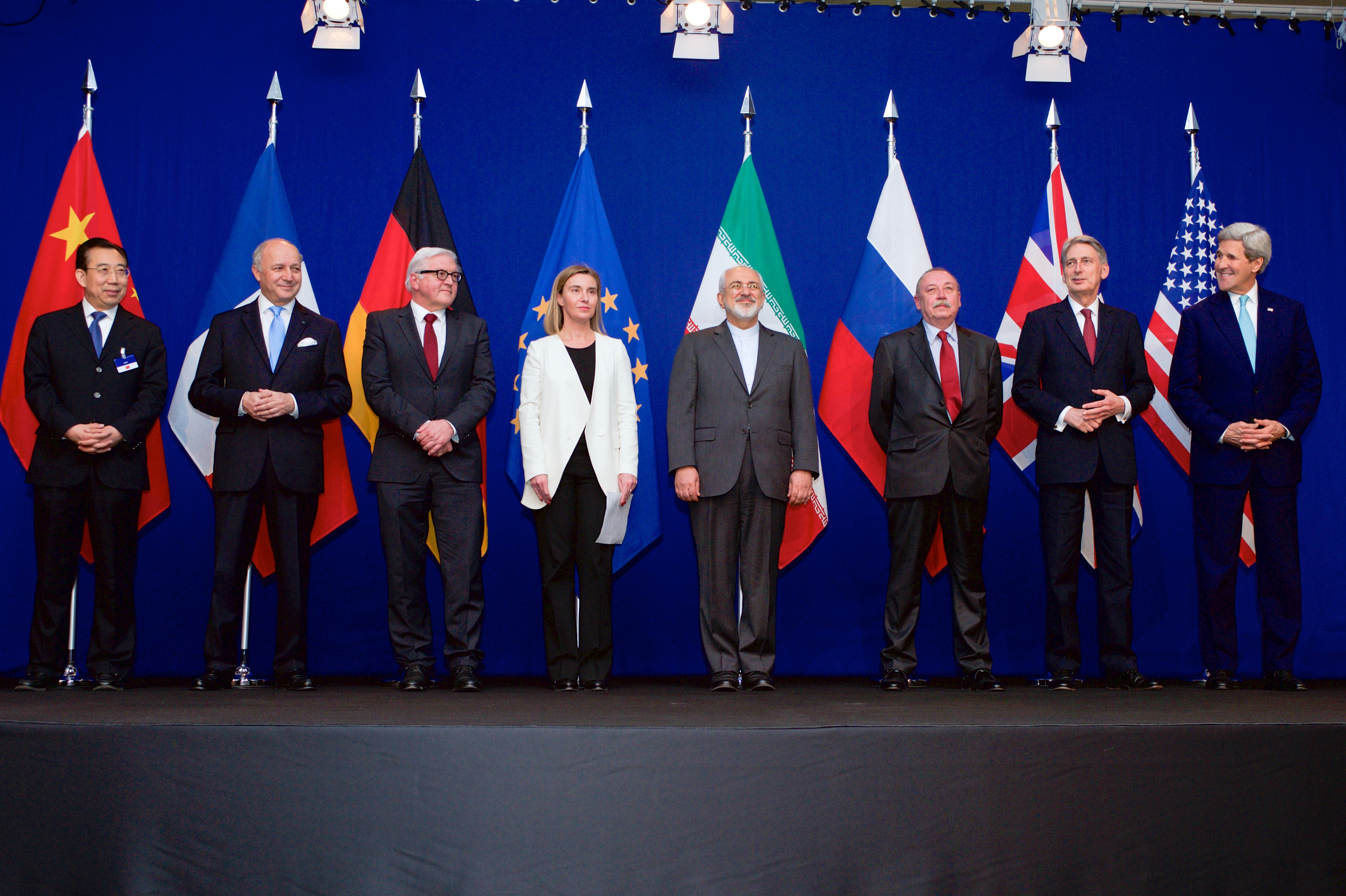
Negotiations about Iranian Nuclear Program, the Ministers of Foreign Affairs and Other Officials of the P5+1 and Ministers of Foreign Affairs of Iran and EU in Lausanne, April 2015

After 20 months, the parties reached the Joint Comprehensive Plan of Action (JCPOA) on July 14, 2015. Under this framework Iran agreed tentatively to accept restrictions on its nuclear program, all of which would last for at least a decade and some longer, and to submit to an increased intensity of international inspections. The Joint Comprehensive Plan of Action (JCPOA), was finally reached on 14 July 2015. The final agreement is based upon "the rules-based nonproliferation regime created by the Nuclear Non-Proliferation Treaty (NPT) and including especially the IAEA safeguards system".

Enrichment was capped at 3.67% for 15 years, and the enriched uranium stockpile limited to 300 kg. Only 5,060 first-generation IR-1 centrifuges could operate at Natanz, and Fordow was repurposed for non-enrichment research. The Arak IR-40 reactor was to be redesigned and rebuilt, with its original core removed and filled with concrete to eliminate plutonium production capability. Iran agreed to provisionally implement the IAEA Additional Protocol, and accepted enhanced verification, including continuous surveillance of enrichment and conversion facilities, monitoring of uranium mines and mills, and oversight of centrifuge manufacturing. Iran's excess enriched uranium, including the bulk of its 20% material, was to be shipped abroad or down-blended. Over 13,000 centrifuges were dismantled. Limited R&D on advanced centrifuges was allowed under controlled conditions without accumulating enriched uranium.

In exchange, the UN, US, and EU committed to stepwise sanctions relief: UN Security Council Resolution 2231 endorsed the JCPOA. It retained a conventional arms embargo for five years and ballistic missile restrictions for eight, and introduced a "snapback" mechanism allowing reimposition of sanctions in case of noncompliance. US and EU sanctions targeting Iran's energy, finance, shipping, and trade sectors were suspended. On "Implementation Day" (January 16, 2016), the IAEA verified Iranian compliance, leading to the unfreezing of billions in Iranian assets and restoration of access to international banking (e.g., SWIFT). Some US sanctions tied to terrorism and human rights remained in force.

=== United States withdrawal and Iranian violations (2018–2025) ===
In 2018, the Mossad reportedly stole nuclear secrets (a cache of documents from Iran's weaponization program) from a secure warehouse in the Turquzabad district of Tehran. According to reports, the agents came in a truck semitrailer at midnight, cut into dozens of safes with "high intensity torches", and carted out "50,000 pages and 163 compact discs of memos, videos and plans" before leaving in time to make their escape when the guards came for the morning shift at 7 am. According to a US intelligence official, an "enormous" Iranian "dragnet operation" was unsuccessful in recovering the documents, which escaped through Azerbaijan. According to the Israelis, the documents and files, which it shared with European countries and the United States, demonstrated that the AMAD Project aimed to develop nuclear weapons, that Iran had a nuclear program when it claimed to have "largely suspended it", and that there were two nuclear sites in Iran that had been hidden from inspectors. Iran claims "the whole thing was a hoax". This influenced Trump's decision to withdraw the United States from the JCPOA and reimpose sanctions on Iran.

In 2018, the United States withdrew from JCPOA, with President Donald Trump stating that "the heart of the Iran deal was a giant fiction: that a murderous regime desired only a peaceful nuclear energy program". The US also contended that the agreement was inadequate because it did not impose limitations on Iran's ballistic missile program, and failed to curb its backing of proxy groups.

In February 2019, the IAEA certified that Iran was still abiding by the international Joint Comprehensive Plan of Action (JCPOA) of 2015. However, on 8 May 2019, Iran announced it would suspend implementation of some parts of the JCPOA, threatening further action in 60 days unless it received protection from US sanctions. In July 2019, the IAEA confirmed that Iran had breached both the 300 kg enriched uranium stockpile limit and the 3.67% refinement limit. On 5 November 2019, Iranian nuclear chief Ali Akbar Salehi announced that Iran would enrich uranium to 5% at the Fordow Fuel Enrichment Plant, adding the country had the capability to enrich uranium to 20% if needed. Also in November, Behrouz Kamalvandi, spokesman for the Atomic Energy Organization of Iran, stated that Iran could enrich up to 60% if needed. President Hassan Rouhani declared that Iran's nuclear program would be "limitless" while the country launched the third phase of withdrawal from the 2015 nuclear deal.

On January 3, 2020, the US assassinated Iranian Quds Force commander Qasem Soleimani, and Iran responded with missile strikes on US. bases. Two days later, Iran's government declared it would no longer observe any JCPOA limits on uranium enrichment capacity, levels, or stockpile size. In March 2020, the IAEA said that Iran had nearly tripled its stockpile of enriched uranium since early November 2019. In late June and early July 2020, there were several explosions in Iran, including one that damaged the Natanz enrichment plant (see 2020 Iran explosions). In September 2020, the IAEA reported that Iran had accumulated ten times as much enriched uranium as permitted by the JCPOA. On 27 November 2020, Iran's top nuclear scientist, Mohsen Fakhrizadeh, was assassinated in Tehran. Fakhrizadeh was believed to be the primary force behind Iran's covert nuclear program for many decades. The New York Times reported that Israel's Mossad was behind the attack and that Mick Mulroy, the former Deputy Defense Secretary for the Middle East said the death of Fakhirizadeh was "a setback to Iran's nuclear program and he was also a senior officer in the Islamic Revolutionary Guard Corps, and that "will magnify Iran's desire to respond by force."

Throughout 2021 and 2022, Iran installed cascades of advanced centrifuges (IR-2m, IR-4, IR-6) at Natanz and Fordow, significantly increasing its enrichment output. In February 2021, the IAEA reported that Iran stopped allowing access to data from nuclear sites, as well as plans for future sites. In April 2021, a sabotage attack struck the Natanz enrichment plant, causing an electrical blackout and damaging centrifuges. Iran responded by further upping enrichment: days later, it began producing 60% enriched uranium, an unprecedented level for Iran, just short of weapons-grade (90% and above). This 60% enrichment took place at Natanz, and later at Fordow as well, yielding a stockpile that as of early 2023 exceeded ~70 kg of 60% uranium. If Iran chose to enrich this material to 90%, it would be sufficient for several nuclear warheads. The UK, France, and Germany said that Iran has "no credible civilian use for uranium metal" and called the news "deeply concerning" because of its "potentially grave military implications" (as the use of metallic enriched uranium is for bombs). On 25 June 2022, in a meeting with the senior diplomat of the EU, Ali Shamkhani, Iran's top security officer, declared that Iran would continue to advance its nuclear program until the West modifies its "illegal behavior".

In July 2022, according to an IAEA report seen by Reuters, Iran had increased its uranium enrichment through the use of sophisticated equipment at its underground Fordow plant in a configuration that can more quickly vary between enrichment levels. In September 2022, Germany, United Kingdom and France expressed doubts over Iran's sincerity in returning to the JCPOA after Tehran insisted that the IAEA close its probes into uranium traces at three undeclared Iranian sites. The IAEA said it could not guarantee the peaceful nature of Iran's nuclear program, stating there had been "no progress in resolving questions about the past presence of nuclear material at undeclared sites". United Nations Secretary-General António Guterres urged Iran to hold "serious dialogue" about nuclear inspections and said IAEA's independence is "essential" in response to Iranian demands to end probes. In February 2023, the IAEA reported having found uranium in Iran enriched to 84%. The Iranian government has claimed that this is an "unintended fluctuation" in the enrichment levels, though the Iranians have been openly enriching uranium to 60% purity, a breach of the 2015 nuclear deal. In 2024, Iranian President Masoud Pezeshkian expressed interest in reopening discussions with the United States on the nuclear deal.

In late October 2024, during a series of Israeli airstrikes in Iran carried out in response to a ballistic missile attack earlier that month, Israel reportedly destroyed a top-secret nuclear weapons research facility known as the Taleghan 2 building, located within the Parchin military complex. In November 2024, Iran announced that it would make new advanced centrifuges after IAEA condemned Iran's non-compliance and secrecy.

=== Current status and recent escalations (2025–present) ===
In January 2025, the exiled opposition group NCRI alleged that Iran is developing long-range missile technology under the Islamic Revolutionary Guard Corps (IRGC), with some designs based on North Korean models. The NCRI said that these missiles, such as the Ghaem-100 and Simorgh, could carry nuclear warheads and reach targets as far as 3,000 kilometres (1,900 mi) away, including parts of Europe. These allegations have not been independently confirmed, but given that several past NCRI claims were later verified by inspectors, they warrant investigation.

In February 2025, The New York Times reported that a "secret team" of Iranian engineers and scientists were seeking a more efficient process of development for nuclear weapons which would allow them to produce them "in a matter of months". However, according to a US official, the methods Iran had been exploring at the time could produce a nuclear weapon, though not one which could be delivered by a ballistic missile.

In March 2025, US President Donald Trump sent a letter to Ali Khamenei seeking to reopen negotiations. Ayatollah Ali Khamenei later said, "Some bullying governments insist on negotiations not to resolve issues but to impose their own expectations," which was seen as in response to the letter.

In late March 2025, Khamenei's top advisor Ali Larijani said Iran would have no choice but to develop nuclear weapons if attacked by the United States, Israel or its allies.

In April 2025, Trump revealed that Iran had decided to undertake talks with the United States for an agreement over its nuclear program. On 12 April, both countries held their first high-level meeting in Oman, followed by a second meeting on 19 April in Italy. On May 16, Trump sent Iran an offer and said they have to move quickly or else bad things would happen. On May 17, Khamenei condemned Trump, saying that he lied about wanting peace and that he was not worth responding to, calling the US demands "outrageous nonsense". Khamenei also reiterated that Israel is a "cancerous tumour" that must be uprooted.

On May 31, 2025, IAEA reported that Iran had sharply increased its stockpile of uranium enriched to 60% purity, just below weapons-grade, reaching over 408 kilograms, a nearly 50% rise since February. The agency warned that this amount is enough for multiple nuclear weapons if further enriched. It also noted that Iran remains the only non-nuclear-weapon state to produce such material, calling the situation a "serious concern". In June 2025, the NCRI said Iran is pursuing nuclear weapons through a new program called the "Kavir Plan". According to the NCRI, the new project involves six sites in Semnan province working on warheads and related technology, succeeding the previous AMAD Project.

On June 10, Trump stated that Iran was becoming "much more aggressive" in the negotiations. On 11 June, the Iranian regime threatened US bases in the Middle East, with Defense Minister Aziz Nasirzadeh stating, "If a conflict is imposed on us... all US bases are within our reach, and we will boldly target them in host countries." The US embassy in Iraq evacuated all personnel. The Iran-backed Yemen-based Houthi movement threatened to attack the United States if a strike on Iran were to occur. CENTCOM presented a wide range of military options for an attack on Iran. UK issued threat advisory for ships on Arabian Gulf. US Secretary of Defense Pete Hegseth told Congress that Iran was attempting a nuclear breakout.

On 12 June 2025, IAEA found Iran non-compliant with its nuclear obligations for the first time in 20 years. Iran retaliated by announcing it would launch a new enrichment site and install advanced centrifuges. The IAEA estimated that Iran then held 440.9 kg of uranium enriched to 60%.

In the early hours of June 13, Israel initiated Operation Rising Lion, a large‑scale aerial assault targeting Iranian nuclear facilities, missile factories, military sites, and commanders across cities including Tehran and Natanz, marking the start of what would come to be known as the Twelve-Day War of 13 to 24 June 2025. Iranian forces said they had shot down an Israeli drone.

On 21 June, the US bombed the Fordow Fuel Enrichment Plant, the Natanz Nuclear Facility, and the Isfahan Nuclear Technology/Research Center in an operation code named Operation Midnight Hammer. In an address from the White House, Trump claimed "Iran's key nuclear enrichment facilities have been completely and totally obliterated," though later reporting said only one site (Fordow) was "mostly destroyed."

In early July 2025, Iran suspended co-operation with the United Nations' International Atomic Energy Agency (IAEA). and all IAEA inspectors left Iran by July 4.

In August 2025, Iran and European nations reached an agreement to recommence discussions focused on the complete restoration of Tehran's nuclear enrichment operations.

France, Britain, and Germany have indicated that they may reinstate UN sanctions on Iran through a "quick return" mechanism should Tehran fail to engage in negotiations.

On August 28, 2025, E3 members, France, Germany, and the United Kingdom, initiated the process of the snapback mechanism, with the prospect of freezing Iranian overseas assets, blocking arms deals with Iran, imposing penal action against development of Iran's ballistic missile program and further restricting Iran's military and nuclear activities. In a letter addressed to the president of the UN Security Council, the foreign ministers of the E3 stated that since 2019, Iran had "increasingly and deliberately ceased performing its JCPOA commitments", including "the accumulation of a highly enriched uranium stockpile which lacks any credible civilian justification and is unprecedented for a state without a nuclear weapons program". The letter detailed additional Iranian violations of the agreement despite the fact that the E3 "have consistently upheld their agreements under the terms of the JCPOA". The activation opened a 30-day window, intended to reengage Iran, "whose refusal to cooperate with the International Atomic Energy Agency's (IAEA) inspectors started the crisis", in diplomatic negotiations before full restoration of sanctions. According to Euronews, Iran's Foreign Minister Abbas Araghchi declared that it was "unjustified, illegal, and lacking any legal basis" and promised that "The Islamic Republic of Iran will respond appropriately".

In September 2025, Iran signed a $25 billion agreement with Russia to build four nuclear reactors in Sirik in Iran. The Generation III reactors are expected to produce 5 GW of electricity. Iran, which suffers power shortages at times of high demand, currently has one operating nuclear power plant, in Bushehr. Also built by Russia, it has a capacity of 1 GW. On 28 September, UN sanctions were officially reimposed on Iran.

In October 2025, former defence minister and current political adviser to the Supreme Leader, Ali Shamkhani, stated "If I returned to the defence portfolio, I would move toward building an atomic bomb", and declared that if he could return to the 1990s, "we would definitely build the atomic bomb".

According to the Institute for International Political Studies (ISPI), sources in Tehran reported that in October 2025, Iranian Supreme Leader Ali Khamenei had authorised the development of miniaturised nuclear warheads for ballistic missiles, despite denials issued at earlier dates. The report stated that although such warheads would require uranium enriched to 90%, this could be achieved in a matter of weeks if Iran were to process its existing stockpile of 441 kg of 60% uranium with its advanced IR-4 and IR-6 centrifuges; and circulated accounts indicate the existence of an ultra-secret enrichment program at one of Iran's covert nuclear sites, to which the IAEA has not been given access.

In February 2026, Iran informed the IAEA that normal safeguards were "legally untenable and materially impracticable," as a result of threats and "acts of aggression," leaving the IAEA unable to verify whether Iran had suspended enrichment or confirm the status of its current stockpile, though it found no evidence Iran was weaponizing.

On 3 March 2026, the International Atomic Energy Agency (IAEA) confirmed that while recent bombings had failed to destroy the Natanz nuclear facility, the significant damage which had been done to its entrance buildings had now made it inaccessible.

In September 2026, the IAEA said it could no longer verify the size, composition or location of Iran’s enriched uranium stockpile because inspectors had been denied access to the country’s main enrichment facilities since June 2025. The IAEA said it was also unable to determine whether Iran had suspended enrichment, what centrifuges it possessed, or the status of a fourth enrichment facility near Isfahan that Iran had announced in 2025. Director General Rafael Grossi described the lack of access as an urgent proliferation concern and urged Iran to admit inspectors.

== Main facilities ==
=== Natanz ===
Natanz, located about 220 kilometres (140 mi) south-east of Tehran, is Iran's main uranium enrichment site. The facility includes an underground Fuel Enrichment Plant (FEP) housing large cascades of gas centrifuges, as well as a smaller Pilot Fuel Enrichment Plant (PFEP) above the ground. Iran has installed thousands of first-generation IR-1 centrifuges and more advanced models (IR-2m, IR-4, IR-6) here. As of 2025, Natanz was enriching uranium up to 60% Uranium_{235}, a level approaching weapons-grade.

In the past, the site saw multiple sabotage attacks, including the US-Israeli Stuxnet cyberattack, and explosions in 2020 and 2021, both attributed to Israel. On 13 June 2025, the site was struck by Israeli airstrikes during the opening stages of the Twelve-Day War (Operation Rising Lion). On 22 June 2025, the facility was bombed by the United States military. On 2 March 2026, the facility was again bombed by the United States, with its entrance buildings suffering significant damage. While the facility, which is based underground, remains intact, the damage to the entrance buildings sustained in these bombings made it inaccessible. On 21 March 2026, the U.S. carried out strikes again at Natanz.

==== Kuh-e Kolang Gaz La ("Pickaxe Mountain") ====
Another site excavated by Iran is described as a future centrifuge assembly facility deep beneath Kūh-e Kolang Gaz Lā ("Pickaxe Mountain"), near the Natanz nuclear complex. The installation, which has been under construction, has been reinforced and gradually expanded since around 2021.

According to an analysis of satellite images by the Washington Post, after the American strikes on June 22, Iran began accelerating construction on the underground site of Kūh-e Kolang Gaz Lā tunneled into the Zagros mountain range approximately one mile (1.5 km) to the south of the Natanz nuclear facility. Although work on the site began in 2020, international inspectors were not given access, and when IAEA director Rafael Grossi enquired about the site, he was answered with "It's none of your business". According to analysts who monitor the site's development, its depth may exceed that of the Natanz Site, at 260–330 feet (79–101 m), significantly reducing the effect of non-nuclear bunker-buster bombs, such as those dropped on Fordow. The mountain above the site is nearly 650 metres taller than that over Fordow, providing more protection and larger chambers for nuclear operations, and it is potentially intended for the secure storage of Iran's stockpile of near-weapons-grade uranium or for covert uranium enrichment. The site's footprint aboveground covers an area of approximately one square mile, and features two pairs of entrance tunnels, one to the east and one to the west. Satellite images reveal major changes made to the site between 30 June and 18 September 2025: construction of a 4,000-foot (1,200 m) security wall which completed the enclosure, reinforcement of one of the tunnel entrances, increased piles of excavated spoil indicating underground expansion, as well as the grading of the road parallel to the perimeter.

=== Fordow ===
Fordow (near the city of Qom, approximately 100 km southwest of Tehran) is an underground enrichment site built inside a mountain. Originally designed to host about 3,000 centrifuges, Fordow was revealed in 2009 and appears engineered to withstand airstrikes. It was re-purposed under the 2015 nuclear deal as a research facility with no enrichment, but Iran resumed enrichment at Fordow after 2019. By 2025, Fordow was enriching uranium up to 60% U-235 as well, deploying advanced IR-6 centrifuges. Fordow's smaller size and heavy fortification make it a particular proliferation concern. The IAEA still inspects Fordow, but Iran's suspension of the Additional Protocol means inspectors no longer have daily access. In June 2025, Iran revealed plans to install advanced centrifuges at the facility. However, following the June 2025 United States airstrikes, Institute for Science and International Security analysts David Albright and Spencer Faragrasso noted that because a penetration hole found above the facility's enrichment hall on satellite images indicated that Fordow was now "likely destroyed and knocked out of operation." In September 2025, IAEA head Rafael Grossi confirmed that the Fordow facility had in fact sustained significant damage in the June 2025 U.S. strike, including total destruction of "almost all" of the site's "sensitive equipment."

=== Bushehr ===
Bushehr is Iran's only commercial nuclear power station, situated on the Persian Gulf coast in southern Iran. The site's first unit, a 1000 MWe pressurized water reactor (VVER-1000) built with Russian assistance, began operation in 2011–2013. Russia supplies the enriched fuel for Bushehr-1 and removes the spent fuel, an arrangement that minimizes proliferation risk. Iran is constructing two additional VVER-1000 reactors at Bushehr with Russian collaboration, slated to come online in the late 2020s. Bushehr is under full IAEA safeguards. Its operation is closely monitored by the Agency, and Iran, like any NPT party, must report and permit inspection of the reactor and its fuel.

=== Arak ===
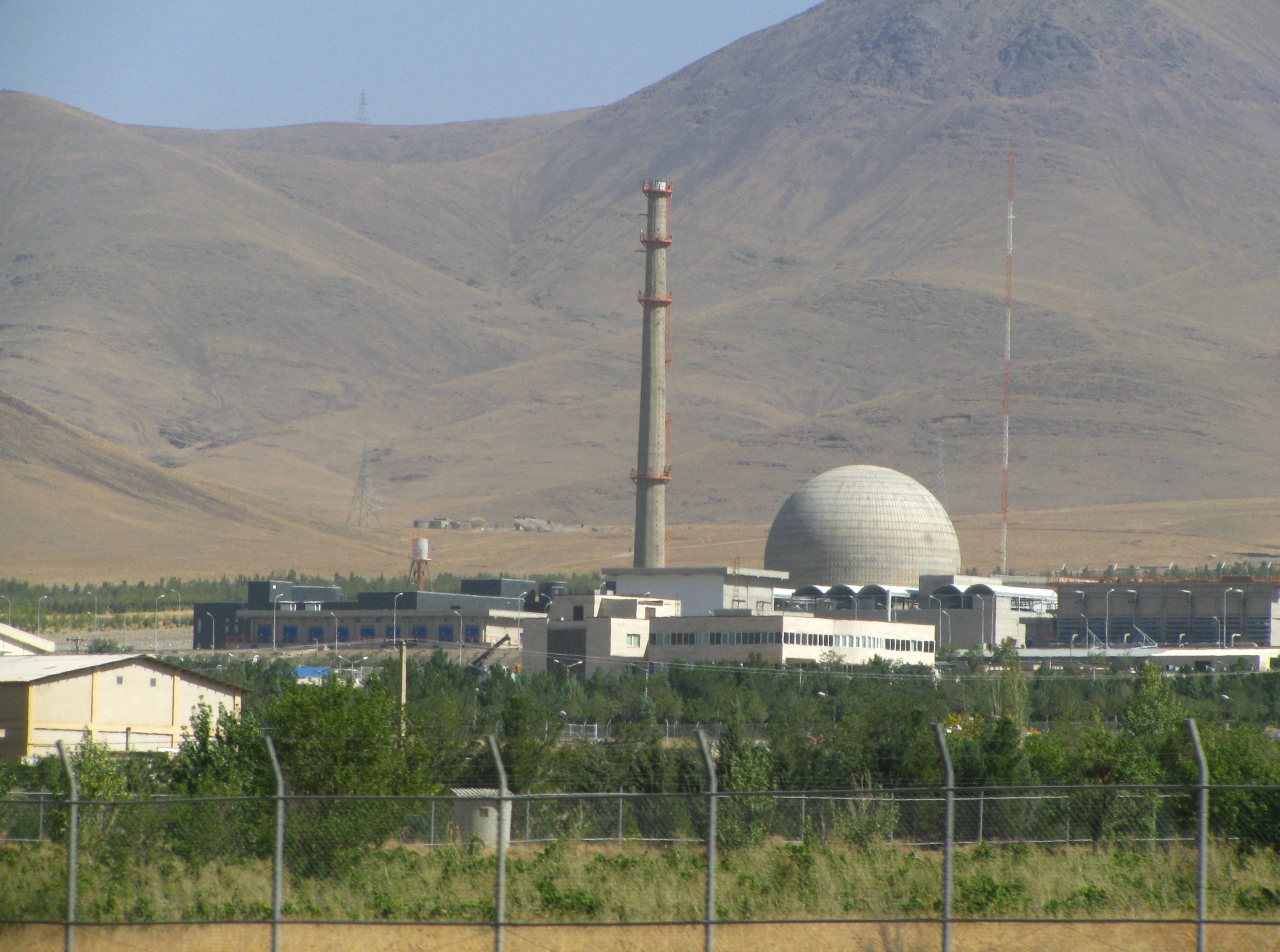
Arak IR-40 complex, a heavy water reactor and production plant

Arak, about 250 km southwest of Tehran, is the site of Iran's IR-40 heavy water reactor and associated heavy water production plant. The 40 MW (thermal) reactor, still under construction, is designed to use natural uranium fuel and heavy water moderation, which would produce plutonium as a byproduct in the spent fuel. In its original configuration, the Arak reactor could have yielded enough plutonium for roughly 1–2 nuclear weapons per year if Iran built a reprocessing facility (which it does not have). Under the JCPOA, Iran agreed to halt work on Arak and redesign the reactor to a smaller, proliferation-resistant version. In January 2016, Iran removed and filled Arak's original reactor core with concrete, disabling it. As of mid-2025, Iran, with international input, has been modifying the reactor design to limit its plutonium output, and the reactor has not yet become operational. A heavy water production plant at the Arak site continues to operate (25 tons/year capacity), supplying heavy water for the reactor and medical research; Iran's heavy water stockpile is under IAEA monitoring per its safeguards commitments. In July 2025, the site was hit in an Israeli air strike which ensured that Arak could not again be usable for nuclear development.

=== Isfahan Nuclear Technology Center ===
Isfahan, located ~350 km south of Tehran, is another major hub of Iran's nuclear fuel cycle and research activities. The site hosts the Uranium Conversion Facility (UCF) where yellowcake (uranium ore concentrate) is converted into uranium hexafluoride (UF_{6}) gas – the feedstock for enrichment. The UCF at Isfahan has produced hundreds of tons of UF_{6} for Natanz and Fordow. Isfahan also houses a Fuel Fabrication Plant for producing nuclear fuel (e.g. fuel plates for the Tehran Research Reactor and prototype fuel for Arak). In addition, the Isfahan Nuclear Technology Center includes laboratories and several small research reactors, supplied by China, used for research and isotope production. The facility sustained significant damage, in two separate bombings which were carried out in June 2025, first carried out by Israel on 13 June 2025, which damaged or destroyed Isfahan's Uranium Conversion facility and also damaged both the Fuel Plate Fabrication Plant and a fourth critical building, and then by the United States on 22 June 2025.

=== Tehran Research Reactor (TRR) ===
Located in Tehran at the headquarters of the Atomic Energy Organization of Iran, the Tehran Research Reactor is a 5 MW pool-type research reactor. It was provided by the United States in 1967 as part of the "Atoms for Peace" program. Originally fueled with highly enriched uranium (HEU), the TRR was converted in 1987 to use 19.75% enriched uranium (LEU). The TRR is used to produce medical isotopes (such as molybdenum-99) and for scientific research. Its need for 20% LEU fuel became a point of contention when Iran's external fuel supply ran low in 2009, prompting the decision to enrich uranium to 20%.

=== Other sites ===
According to a May 2025 report by IAEA, several undeclared locations in Iran remain at the center of its investigation into uranium traces from Iran's past nuclear activities. These include Turquzabad, first identified publicly in 2018 when Israeli Prime Minister Benjamin Netanyahu claimed it was a secret nuclear warehouse. Inspectors later detected undeclared man-made uranium particles there in 2019. Two other sites, Varamin and Marivan, also yielded undeclared man-made uranium particles when IAEA inspectors were granted access in 2020. A fourth site, Lavisan-Shian, has been under scrutiny as well, though inspectors were never able to visit it because it was demolished after 2003. IAEA concluded that these locations, and possibly others too, were part of an undeclared nuclear program conducted by Iran up until the early 2000s. In June 2025, concerning the same report, China, Russia, Belarus, Venezuela, Cuba, and Nicaragua echoed Iran's perspective of "UNSC Resolution 2231 remain[ing] valid and [it having to] be implemented by all countries" with "[t]he unilateral withdrawal of the United States from the JCPOA [being] the primary cause of the [then] current situation." Concerning the specifics of concerns over the uranium particles detected at three sites, the countries believed in the ability of the organization to "verify the non-diversion of nuclear material" arising from pre-2003 nuclear safeguards issues refuted in an IAEA December 2015 resolution, and discounted the report due to not being mandated by IAEA director Rafael Grossi and instead by a November 2024 "politically-motivated, non-consensus resolution".

On 12 June 2025, a day before the start of the Twelve-Day War, Iran announced the activation of a third main uranium enrichment site with active centrifuges following the IAEA's first formal censure of Iran in two decades. While the location has not been disclosed, Iranian officials described it as "secure and invulnerable". In response to Grossi's 19 June 2025 remark "[w]e did not have any evidence of a systematic effort [by Iran] to move into a nuclear weapon" in regard to concerns raised by the May 2025 report, Iran’s Foreign Ministry spokesman Esmaeil Baghaei decried its timing, linking the "absolutely biased report" with Israel's subsequent attacks against "peaceful nuclear facilities [and] innocent civilians". Iran has vowed to continue enriching uranium following the Twelve-Day War.

== Costs ==
=== Direct financial expenditures ===
Estimating the direct costs of Iran's nuclear program is complicated by secrecy, but available assessments suggest significant expenditures.

Category	Estimated cost	Ref.
Bushehr nuclear plant	>$10 billion (vs $2B official)	
Broader nuclear infrastructure	>$100 billion	
Eurodif take (1970s)	$1 billion	
Hormozgan plant (planned)	>$20 billion	
Annual operational costs	$250–$300 million	
Total spending estimate	>$30 billion	

=== Indirect economic burdens and opportunity costs ===
The sanctions and lost economic opportunities far outweigh direct spending:

Cost area	Estimated value	Ref.
Lost economic opportunity	$2–3 trillion	
Lost oil revenues	>$450 billion	
Lost foreign investment	>$100 billion	
Rial devaluation (2014–2025)	~95%	
Energy renovation cost (alternative)	~$54 billion	

Despite the vast reserves of natural gas and abundant solar and renewable energy potential, Iran continues to invest in extremely high-cost nuclear projects. Former Foreign Minister Zarif admitted that financial expenditures spent on nuclear projects could have upgraded the entire energy sector over 20 times.

== Analysis ==
Iran's nuclear program is commonly viewed as serving several purposes, according to widely cited analyses. In September 2025, the GAMAAN Institute conducted a survey involving around 30,000 Iranians over the age of 15. The results indicated that 47% agreed that "to prevent another war, the Islamic Republic should stop enriching uranium", while 36% disagreed. Additionally, 49% of surveyed individuals opposed Iran developing nuclear weapons, and 36% disagreed. The program has also been closely tied to Iranian techno-nationalist pride, symbolizing scientific progress and national independence.

Throughout the early 2010s, US, EU, Russian and Chinese officials and analysts said Iran was pursuing nuclear latency, developing the technical infrastructure to assemble a weapon on short notice while refraining from actual production. Such latency is believed to support nuclear deterrence, dissuading foreign powers from attempts at aggression or domination, projecting Iranian power in the region. The Bulletin of the Atomic Scientists said that Iran was using its enrichment program and uranium stockpiles for leverage in international negotiations, and was willing to dilute or export its higher-level enriched uranium in exchange for sanctions relief and prevention of future attacks. Others in the West have cited US and Israeli aggression toward Iran, especially after the 2025 and 2026 escalations, as a strong incentive to weaponize. Jeffrey Lewis said that Iran was "likely to reach the same conclusion that North Korea reached, that it’s a dangerous world out there with the United States, and it’s better to go nuclear." Ramesh Thakur said, "For Iran, nuclear weapons are now the only thing that will guarantee regime survival. So why wouldn’t they get them?"

Many Western analysts believe a nuclear-armed Iran would pose significant global security risks and undermine Middle Eastern stability. International Atomic Energy Agency (IAEA) chief Rafael Grossi said that an Iranian nuclear weapon could trigger broad nuclear proliferation, as other countries, particularly in the Middle East, may seek similar capabilities in response. Saudi Arabia and Turkey have indicated they might pursue nuclear capabilities if Iran were to develop them. Some scholars have argued that Israel's nuclear weapons may have incentivized Iran to pursue its own, risking a regional nuclear arms race.

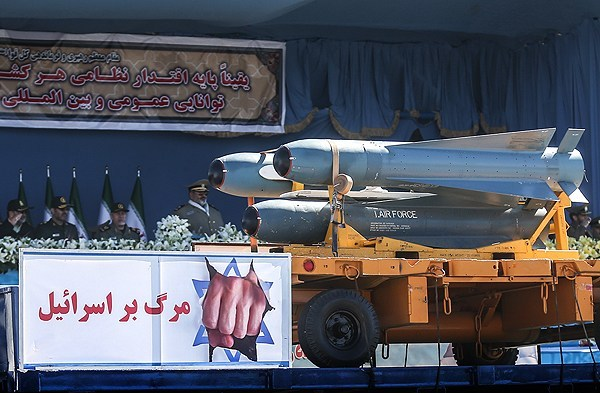
The words "Death to Israel" in Persian displayed on a parade in Iran. Some analysts view Iran's nuclear program as a threat to Israel's security.

Other proposed motivations include expanding Iran's alleged support for non-state militant actors or threats against Israel, with concerns that Iranian nuclear assets could, in the event of internal instability or regime change, fall into the hands of extremist factions or non-state actors, heightening fears of nuclear terrorism. Alireza Nader argued that a nuclear-armed Iran could feel emboldened to increase its support for non-state militant groups while deterring retaliation through its newfound nuclear leverage. Some analysts and US officials maintain that a nuclear-capable Iran would likely attempt to destroy Israel or threaten its existence. In the 21st century, many Western and Israeli politicians have stated "Iran can never have a nuclear weapon", a political slogan of Israel's government and its international supporters.

== See also ==
- Timeline of the nuclear program of Iran
- Nuclear weapons of Israel
- Iran and weapons of mass destruction
- Israel and weapons of mass destruction
- Twelve-Day War
- Iran's ballistic missiles program
- Israeli missile program
- Iran and state-sponsored terrorism
- Israel and state-sponsored terrorism
- Iran can never have a nuclear weapon
- Manufactured Crisis: The Untold Story of the Iran Nuclear Scare

Malware:

- Duqu
- Flame (malware)
- Stuxnet

People

- Akbar Etemad, the "father of Iran's nuclear program"
- Mehdi Sarram, nuclear scientist
- List of Iranian nuclear negotiators

=== Security ===
- Nuclear Security & Protection Corps
