= Germany and weapons of mass destruction =

Federal Republic of Germany
- Nuclear weapons stationing start date: 1955; 71 years ago
- Nuclear weapons stationing provider: United States (1955–present); Soviet Union ( in contemporary East Germany, 1959 and 1969–1991)
- Peak nuclear weapons stationed: 3,500 warheads (US only)
- Current nuclear weapons stationed: 10–15 warheads

The United States has stationed nuclear weapons in Germany since 1955, currently numbering 10 to 15 tactical nuclear gravity bombs. Germany is not believed to currently possess or host chemical or biological weapons. Germany is party to the Non-Proliferation Treaty, Biological Weapons Convention, and Chemical Weapons Convention. Under the Two Plus Four Treaty, nuclear weapons may not be stored in the former territory of East Germany or West Berlin.

As of 2025, the United States Air Force has custody of 10 to 15 B61 nuclear bombs, stored at Büchel Air Base, intended for delivery by German Air Force Panavia Tornado IDS fighter-bombers. The weapons are under NATO's nuclear sharing operations. The aircraft will be replaced by German F-35A Lightning II aircraft and the bombs are being upgraded to the B61 Mod 12.

During the Cold War, West Germany hosted a wider range of US nuclear weapons, peaking at around 3,500, including the Pershing ballistic missiles, cruise missiles, nuclear artillery, and the Nike Hercules surface-to-air missile. It also hosted US chemical weapons in the form of approximately 100,000 sarin and VX nerve agent munitions, until their 1990 removal. East Germany hosted Soviet nuclear weapons from 1969 to 1991, including the RSD-10 Pioneer for a period, as well as briefly in 1959 during the Second Berlin Crisis.

During World War II, Nazi Germany used toxic gases to kill millions of Jewish people and other victims, as part of the Holocaust. Germany stockpiled battlefield chemical weapons and investigated nuclear and biological weapons. During its rearmament in violation of the Treaty of Versailles, Germany discovered the first nerve agents, stockpiling tabun, sarin, and soman, but did not use them for fear of Allied retaliation. Kurt Blome was a leader of biological agent experiments on prisoners in Nazi concentration camps. German nuclear research was limited to laboratories and industrial production of heavy water; physicists carried out 19 major nuclear experiments but did not achieve a critical nuclear reactor.

During World War I, the German Empire was the first country to use lethal chemical weapons, with chlorine at the 1915 Second Battle of Ypres. Germany also made first use of mustard gas in 1917 and used phosgene.

Germany is considered a nuclear latent state. Under the Non-Proliferation Treaty and Two Plus Four Treaty, Germany is forbidden from developing nuclear weapons. US nuclear weapons in Germany were a contentious political issue prior to the Russia-Ukraine war. The Social Democratic Party and Greens had called for their removal and accession to the 2017 Treaty on the Prohibition of Nuclear Weapons, but the 2021 Scholz cabinet including both parties rejected this.

Alongside other countries, German companies sold chemical precursors to Ba'athist Iraq utilized by the Iraqi chemical weapons program, including chemical attacks against Iran during the Iran–Iraq War. German companies were also accused of assisting Iraqi ballistic missile development. Due to 1991 Iraqi missile attacks against Israel, Germany agreed to construct for Israel and partly subsidize its six Dolphin-class submarines, widely believed to carry Israeli nuclear cruise missiles.

== Nuclear weapons ==
=== World War II ===
Nazi Germany undertook several research programs relating to nuclear technology, including nuclear weapons and nuclear reactors, before and during World War II. These were variously called Uranverein (Uranium Society) or Uranprojekt (Uranium Project). The first effort started in April 1939, just months after the discovery of nuclear fission in Berlin in December 1938, but ended shortly ahead of the September 1939 German invasion of Poland, for which many German physicists were drafted into the Wehrmacht. A second effort under the administrative purview of the Wehrmacht's Heereswaffenamt began on September 1, 1939, the day of the invasion of Poland. The program eventually expanded into three main efforts: Uranmaschine (nuclear reactor) development, uranium and heavy water production, and uranium isotope separation. Eventually, the German military determined that nuclear fission would not contribute significantly to the war, and in January 1942 the Heereswaffenamt turned the program over to the Reich Research Council (Reichsforschungsrat) while continuing to fund the activity.

The program was split up among nine major institutes where the directors dominated research and set their own objectives. Subsequently, the number of scientists working on applied nuclear fission began to diminish as many researchers applied their talents to more pressing wartime demands. The most influential people in the Uranverein included Kurt Diebner, Abraham Esau, Walther Gerlach, and Erich Schumann. Schumann was one of the most powerful and influential physicists in Germany. Diebner, throughout the life of the nuclear weapon project, had more control over nuclear fission research than did Walther Bothe, Klaus Clusius, Otto Hahn, Paul Harteck, or Werner Heisenberg. Esau was appointed as Reichsmarschall Hermann Göring's plenipotentiary for nuclear physics research in December 1942, and was succeeded by Walther Gerlach after he resigned in December 1943.

Politicization of German academia under the Nazi regime of 1933–1945 had driven many physicists, engineers, and mathematicians out of Germany as early as 1933. Those of Jewish heritage who did not leave were quickly purged, further thinning the ranks of researchers. The politicization of the universities, along with Wehrmacht demands for more manpower (many scientists and technical personnel were conscripted, despite possessing technical and engineering skills), substantially reduced the number of able German physicists.

Developments took place in several phases, but in the words of historian Mark Walker, it ultimately became "frozen at the laboratory level" with the "modest goal" to "build a nuclear reactor which could sustain a nuclear fission chain reaction for a significant amount of time and to achieve the complete separation of at least tiny amounts of the uranium isotopes". The scholarly consensus is that it failed to achieve these goals, and that despite fears at the time, the Germans had never been close to producing nuclear weapons. The final attempt at constructing a reactor, the 1945 Haigerloch research reactor, did not achieve criticality. With the war in Europe ending in early 1945, various Allied powers competed with each other to obtain surviving components of the German nuclear industry (personnel, facilities, and materiel), as they did with the pioneering V-2 short-range ballistic missile program. The Western Allied effort was the Alsos Mission and the Soviet effort was Russian Alsos. Due to the success of the Manhattan Project, the Western Allies prioritized denying German nuclear scientists and resources to the nascent Soviet atomic bomb project.

=== Cold War ===
As part of the accession negotiations of West Germany to the Western European Union at the London and Paris Conferences, the country was forbidden (by Protocol No III to the revised Treaty of Brussels of 23 October 1954) to possess nuclear, biological or chemical weapons. This was reiterated in domestic law by the Kriegswaffenkontrollgesetz (War Weapons Control Act). During the Cold War, nuclear weapons were deployed in Germany by both the United States (in West Germany) and the Soviet Union (in East Germany). Despite not being among the nuclear powers during the Cold War, Germany had a political and military interest in the balance of nuclear capability. In 1977, after the Soviet deployment of the new SS-20 IRBM, West German chancellor Helmut Schmidt expressed concern over the capability of NATO's nuclear forces compared to those of the Soviets. Later in the Cold War under the chancellorship of Helmut Kohl, the West German government expressed concern about the progress of the nuclear arms race. Particularly, they addressed the eagerness of Germany's NATO allies, the United States and United Kingdom, to seek restrictions on long-range strategic weapons while modernizing their short-range and tactical nuclear systems. Germany wanted to see such short range systems eliminated, because their major use was not deterrence but battlefield employment. Germany itself, straddling the division of the Eastern and Western blocs in Europe, was a likely battlefield in any escalation of the Cold War and battlefield use of nuclear weapons would be devastating to German territory.

In 1957, the European Atomic Energy Community (Euratom) was created to promote the use of nuclear energy in Europe. Under cover of the peaceful use of nuclear power, West Germany hoped to develop the basis of a nuclear weapons programme with France and Italy. The West German Chancellor Konrad Adenauer told his cabinet that he "wanted to achieve, through EURATOM, as quickly as possible, the chance of producing our own nuclear weapons". The idea was short-lived. In 1958 Charles De Gaulle became President of France, and Germany and Italy were excluded from the weapons project. Euratom continued as the European agency for the peaceful use of nuclear technology, falling under the institutions of the European Economic Community in 1967.

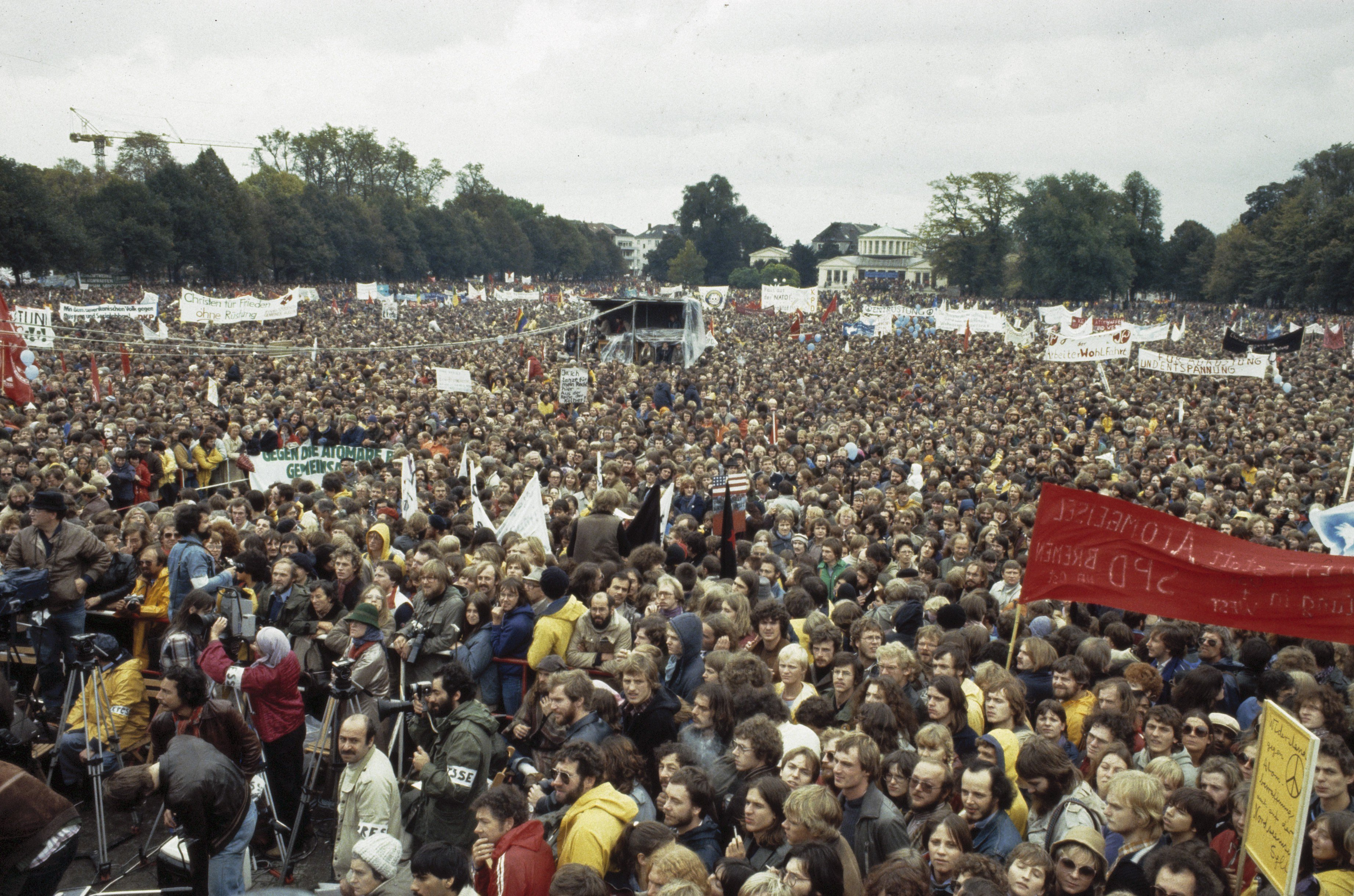
Protest in Bonn against the deployment of Pershing II missiles in West Germany, 1981

Germany ratified the Geneva Protocol on 25 April 1929, the Nuclear Non-Proliferation Treaty on 2 May 1975, the Biological Weapons Convention on 7 April 1983 and the Chemical Weapons Convention on 12 August 1994. These dates signify ratification by the Federal Republic of Germany (West Germany), during the division of Germany the NPT and the BWC were ratified separately by the German Democratic Republic (East Germany) (on 31 October 1969 and 28 November 1972, respectively).

Before German reunification in 1990, both West and East Germany ratified the Treaty on the Final Settlement with Respect to Germany. Germany reaffirmed its renunciation of the manufacture, possession, and control of nuclear, biological, and chemical weapons. In addition to banning a foreign military presence in the former East Germany, the treaty also banned nuclear weapons or nuclear weapon carriers to be stationed in the area, making it a permanent Nuclear-Weapon-Free Zone. The German military was allowed to possess conventional weapons systems with nonconventional capabilities, provided that they were outfitted for a purely conventional role.

==== Construction of Israeli submarines ====
Germany constructed the Dolphin-class submarine for Israel, widely believed to carry the nuclear-armed long-range Popeye Turbo cruise missile of the Israeli nuclear weapons program.

First budgeted in July 1989 and ordered in January 1990, by November the order for the submarines was cancelled. This was due to budget reallocation aimed at countering Iraqi threats made against Israel following the Iraqi invasion and annexation of neighboring Kuwait during the leadup to the 1991 Gulf War. Funding for the first two boats (Dolphin and Leviathan) was fully subsidized by the German government to restart the construction program and the third (Tekumah) received a 50% subsidy. During the First Gulf War, it was revealed that German firms had assisted Iraq with modernizing its ballistic missile and chemical weapon programs, thanks in part to lax enforcement by German customs, in violation of the Missile Technology Control Regime protocols which West Germany had acceded to in 1987. These enhanced missiles brought Israeli cities into Iraqi targeting range for the first time, and the Iraqi weapons research program included factories and necessary supplies for the creation of weaponized mustard and nerve gas. Though not a belligerent in the Gulf War, Israeli cities were nevertheless bombarded by these upgraded Iraqi missiles. To compensate Israel for war-related damage and economic losses and keep German shipyards occupied with a high profile project in the post Cold War defense spending downturn, then Chancellor of Germany Helmut Kohl approved an assistance package to German industry including the construction of two Dolphin-class submarines.

=== Post-Cold War ===
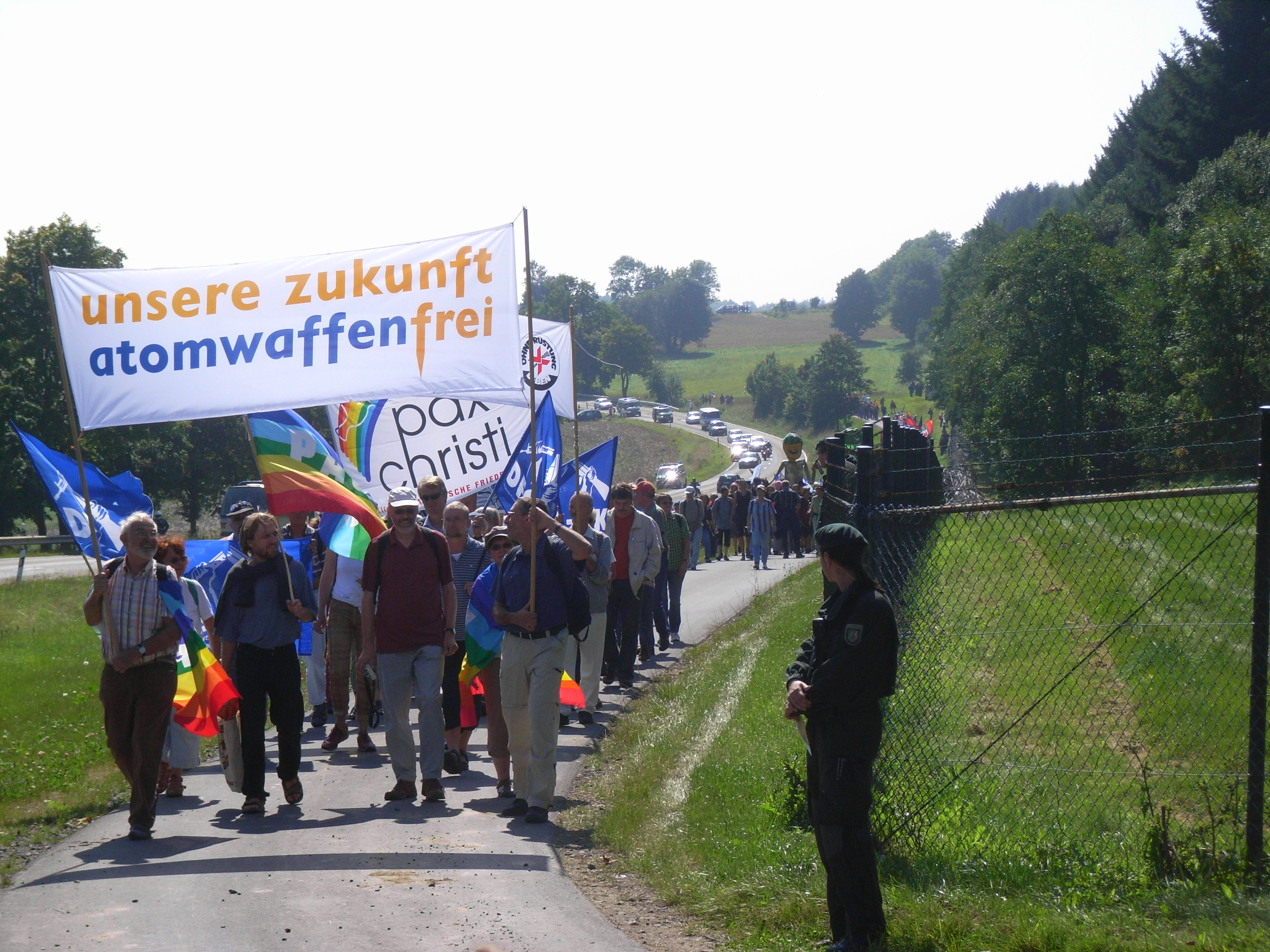
Demonstration against nuclear weapons in Germany at Büchel Air Base in 2008

As of 2025, the United States Air Force has custody of 10 to 15 B61 nuclear bombs, stored at Büchel Air Base, intended for delivery by German Air Force Panavia Tornado IDS fighter-bombers. The aircraft will be replaced by German F-35A Lightning II aircraft and the bombs are being upgraded to the B61 Mod 12.

As well as being a breach of the Protocols to the (revised) Treaty of Brussels (terminated in 2010), many countries believe this violates Articles I and II of the Nuclear Non-Proliferation Treaty (NPT), where Germany has committed:

"... not to receive the transfer from any transferor whatsoever of nuclear weapons or other nuclear explosive devices or of control over such weapons or explosive devices directly, or indirectly ... or otherwise acquire nuclear weapons or other nuclear explosive devices ...".

The U.S. insists its forces control the weapons and that no transfer of the nuclear bombs or control over them is intended "unless and until a decision were made to go to war, at which the [NPT] treaty would no longer be controlling", so there is no breach of the NPT. However German pilots and other staff practise handling and delivering the U.S. nuclear bombs. Even if the NATO argument is considered legally correct, such peacetime operations could arguably contravene both the objective and the spirit of the NPT.

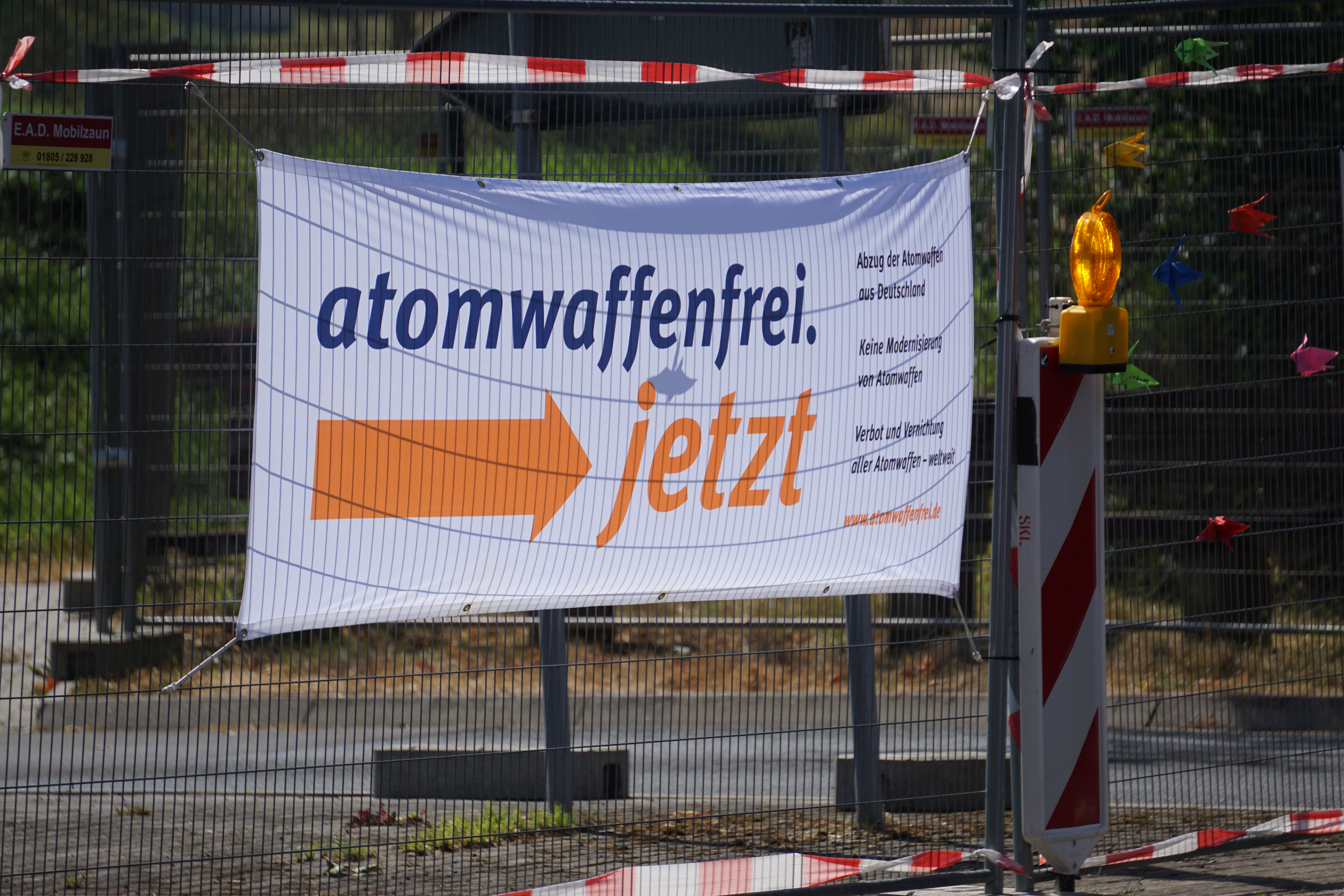
Protest banner outside Büchel Air Base, 2018, where United States nuclear weapons are stored, reading "Nuclear-weapon-free. Now."

In 2007, former German defence secretary Rupert Scholz stated that Germany should strive to become a nuclear power. In September 2007 the French president Nicolas Sarkozy offered Germany the opportunity to participate in control over the French nuclear arsenal. Chancellor Merkel and foreign minister Steinmeier declined the offer however, stating that Germany "had no interest in possessing nuclear weapons". Due to concerns over Vladimir Putin's actions, Merkel reversed her position, stating to the German press, "As long as there are nuclear weapons in the world, we need to have these capabilities, as NATO says."

NATO member states, including Germany, decided not to sign the UN treaty on the Prohibition of Nuclear Weapons, a binding agreement for negotiations for the total elimination of nuclear weapons, supported by more than 120 nations.

German economist and politician Tobias Lindner called Germany's nuclear sharing agreement "an expensive, dangerous and antiquated symbolic contribution to have a say within NATO."

In October 2021, German Defense Minister Annegret Kramp-Karrenbauer had talked about the possibility of deploying nuclear weapons against Russia. She noted that nuclear weapons are a "means of deterrence."

In regards to the relationship with the United States, the 2021 government under then-chancellor Olaf Scholz agreed with a longstanding agreement that allows American tactical nuclear weapons to be stored on American bases in Germany. This came after claims made by Rolf Mützenich in November 2021 that he wants to move NATO B61 nuclear bombs out of Germany.

In 2022, some factions in Alternative for Germany (AfD) supported calls for Germany to acquire nuclear weapons.

In 2024, German chancellor Friedrich Merz stated his intention to begin talks with France and the UK to supplement the US-owned nuclear weapons with French and British ones.

== Chemical weapons ==
=== World War I ===
One of the major combatants in World War I, Germany was the first to develop and use chemical weapons such as mustard gas and phosgene. These kinds of weapon were subsequently also employed by the Allies.

The use of chemical weapons in warfare during the Great War was allegedly in violation of clause IV.2 'Declaration concerning the Prohibition of the Use of Projectiles with the Sole Object to Spread Asphyxiating Poisonous Gases' of the 1899 Hague Declarations, and more explicitly in violation of the 1907 Hague Convention on Land Warfare, which explicitly forbade the use of "poison or poisoned weapons" in warfare.

=== World War II ===
==== Development ====
German scientists researched chemical weapons during the war, including human experimentation with mustard gas. The first nerve gas, tabun, was invented by the German researcher Gerhard Schrader in 1937. During the war, Germany stockpiled tabun, sarin, and soman but refrained from their use on the battlefield. In total, Germany produced about 78,000 tons of chemical weapons. By 1945 the nation had produced about 12,000 tons of tabun and 1,000 pounds (450 kg) of sarin. Delivery systems for the nerve agents included 105 mm and 150 mm artillery shells, a 250 kg bomb and a 150 mm rocket.

Even when the Soviet army neared Berlin, Adolf Hitler decided not to use tabun in a last ditch effort against the Soviets. The use of tabun was opposed by Hitler's Minister of Armaments, Albert Speer, who, in 1943, brought IG Farben's nerve agent expert Otto Ambros to report to Hitler. He informed Hitler that the Allies had stopped publication of research into organophosphates (a type of organic compound that encompasses nerve agents) at the beginning of the war, that the essential nature of nerve gases had been published as early as the turn of the century, and that he believed that Allies would be able to produce agents like tabun. This was not in fact the case, but Hitler accepted Ambros's deduction, and Germany's tabun arsenal remained unused.

===== Kurt Blome =====
Blome also worked on aerosol dispersants and methods of spraying nerve agents like Tabun and Sarin from aircraft, and tested the effects of these gases on prisoners at Auschwitz. I.G. Farben had developed nerve gas in 1936 as a result of its research into insecticides, and Blome's duties included preparing defensive measures against possible Allied use of insect-borne biological weapons, either in a first strike or in retaliation for German use of such weapons. As early as September 1940, Wolfram Sievers, director of the SS Ahnenerbe Institute, had warned Blome of the need to expand the production of insecticides to deal with this eventuality. This led Blome to experiment with the dispersal of insecticides, fungicides, and nerve gas from aircraft, especially after Hitler had ordered a "drastic increase" in the production of Tabun and Sarin at I.G. Farben's Dyhernfurth factory in eastern Germany. On orders from Himmler in 1944, Blome also tested these on inmates at Auschwitz.

==== The Holocaust ====
During the Holocaust, a genocide perpetrated by Nazi Germany, millions of Jews, Romani, Slavs, homosexuals, people with disabilities, and other victims were gassed with carbon monoxide and hydrogen cyanide (including Zyklon B). This remains the deadliest use of poison gas in history. Nevertheless, the Nazis did not extensively use chemical weapons in combat, at least not against the Western Allies, despite maintaining an active chemical weapons program in which the Nazis used concentration camp prisoners as forced labor to secretly manufacture tabun, a nerve gas, and experimented upon concentration camp victims to test the effects of the gas. Otto Ambros of IG Farben was a chief chemical-weapons expert for the Nazis.

==== Use of asphyxiating gas against Soviet forces ====
The Nazis did use chemical weapons in combat on several occasions along the Black Sea, notably in Sevastopol, where they used toxic smoke to force Soviet resistance fighters out of caverns below the city, in violation of the 1925 Geneva Protocol. The Nazis also used asphyxiating gas in the catacombs of Odessa in November 1941, following their capture of the city, and in late May 1942 during the Battle of the Kerch Peninsula in eastern Crimea. Victor Israelyan, a Soviet ambassador, reported that the latter incident was perpetrated by the Wehrmacht's Chemical Forces and organized by a special detail of SS troops with the help of a field engineer battalion. Chemical Forces General Ochsner reported to German command in June 1942 that a chemical unit had taken part in the battle. After the battle in mid-May 1942, roughly 3,000 Red Army soldiers and Soviet civilians not evacuated by sea were besieged in a series of caves and tunnels in the nearby Adzhimushkay quarry. After holding out for approximately three months, "poison gas was released into the tunnels, killing all but a few score of the Soviet defenders." Thousands of those killed around Adzhimushkay were documented to have been killed by asphyxiation from gas.

==== Non-use of nerve agents ====
The Nazis' decision to avoid the use of chemical weapons on the battlefield has been variously attributed to a lack of technical ability in the German chemical weapons program and fears that the Allies would retaliate with their own chemical weapons. It also has been speculated to have arisen from Adolf Hitler's experiences as a soldier in the German army during World War I, where he was injured by a British mustard gas attack in 1918. After the Battle of Stalingrad, Joseph Goebbels, Robert Ley, and Martin Bormann urged Hitler to approve the use of tabun and other chemical weapons to slow the Soviet advance. At a May 1943 meeting in the Wolf's Lair, however, Hitler was told by Ambros that Germany had 45,000 tons of chemical gas stockpiled, but that the Allies likely had far more. Hitler responded by suddenly leaving the room and ordering production of tabun and sarin to be doubled, but "fearing some rogue officer would use them and spark Allied retaliation, he ordered that no chemical weapons be transported to the Russian front." After the Allied invasion of Italy, the Germans rapidly moved to remove or destroy both German and Italian chemical-weapon stockpiles, "for the same reason that Hitler had ordered them pulled from the Russian front—they feared that local commanders would use them and trigger Allied chemical retaliation."

Stanley P. Lovell, deputy director for Research and Development of the Office of Strategic Services, reports in his book Of Spies and Stratagems that the Allies knew the Germans had quantities of Gas Blau available for use in the defense of the Atlantic Wall. The use of nerve gas on the Normandy beachhead would have seriously impeded the Allies and possibly caused the invasion to fail altogether. He submitted the question "Why was nerve gas not used in Normandy?" to be asked of Hermann Göring during his interrogation after the war had ended. Göring answered that the reason was that the Wehrmacht was dependent upon horse-drawn transport to move supplies to their combat units, and had never been able to devise a gas mask horses could tolerate; the versions they developed would not pass enough pure air to allow the horses to pull a cart. Thus, gas was of no use to the German Army under most conditions.

=== Cold War ===
==== US chemical weapons stationing ====
At a United States Army Site near Clausen, West Germany, 100,000 GB and VX filled American chemical munitions were stored in 15 concrete bunkers. These munitions were managed by the 330th Ordnance Company (EOD) and guarded by the 110th Military Police Company both headquartered in nearby Münchweiler an der Rodalb. The propellants for these munitions were stored in Leimen Site 67. The GB and VX munitions had undergone a refurbishment from 1980 to 1982. The weapons in this depot were scheduled to be moved due to an agreement between the United States and West Germany. The 1986 agreement, between Ronald Reagan and Helmut Kohl, provided for the removal of 155 mm and 8 inch unitary chemical projectiles.

==== Potential Soviet chemical weapons stationing ====
In 1990, West German intelligence claimed that Soviet chemical weapons were stationed in East Germany. Soviet and East German officials denied this. West German officials carried out an two-week investigation in July 1990, which apparently found no chemical weapons.

==== Commercial assistance to Iraqi chemical weapons program ====
As part of Project 922, West German firms helped build Iraqi chemical weapons facilities such as laboratories, bunkers, an administrative building, and first production buildings in the early 1980s under the cover of a pesticide plant. Other West German firms sent 1,027 tons of precursors of mustard gas, sarin, tabun, and tear gasses in all. This work allowed Iraq to produce 150 tons of mustard agent and 60 tons of Tabun in 1983 and 1984 respectively, continuing throughout the decade. All told, 52% of Iraq's international chemical weapon equipment was of German origin. One of the contributions was a £14m chlorine plant known as "Falluja 2", built by Uhde Ltd, then a UK subsidiary of West German chemical company Hoechst AG; the plant was given financial guarantees by the UK Export Credits Guarantee Department despite official UK recognition of a "strong possibility" the plant would be used to make mustard gas. The guarantees led to UK government payment of £300,000 to Uhde in 1990 after completion of the plant was interrupted by the first Gulf War. Saddam’s son Qusay was said to have been put in charge of concealing chemical weapons from international inspectors. In 1994 and 1996 three people were convicted in Germany of export offenses.

== Biological weapons ==
=== World War II ===
Blome worked on methods of storage and dispersal of biological agents like plague, cholera, anthrax, and typhoid, and also infected prisoners with plague in order to test the efficacy of vaccines. At the University of Strassburg, a "special unit" headed by Prof. Eugen von Haagen and employing researchers like Kurt Gutzeit and Arnold Dohmen, tested typhus, hepatitis, nephritis, and other chemical and biological weapons on concentration camp inmates. Gutzeit was in charge of hepatitis research for the German Army, and he and his colleagues carried out virus experiments on mental patients, Jews, Russian POWs and Gypsies in Sachsenhausen, Auschwitz and other locations. In October 1944, Himmler also ordered Blome to experiment with plague on concentration camp prisoners.

== See also ==
- German nuclear program during World War II
- Nuclear sharing

== Sources ==
- Walker, Mark (1995). Nazi Science: Myth, Truth, and the German Atomic Bomb. Perseus. ISBN 0-30644941-2.
