= Federal Office of Economics and Export Control =

German federal agency

Federal Office for Economic Affairs and Export Control
- Bundesamt für Wirtschaft und Ausfuhrkontrolle

Agency overview
- Formed: 1954
- Preceding agency: Bundesamt für Wirtschaft (BAW) Bundesausfuhramt
- Jurisdiction: Government of Germany
- Headquarters: Eschborn, close to Frankfurt
- Employees: About 910
- Parent agency: Federal Ministry of Economics and Technology (Germany)

The Federal Office for Economic Affairs and Export Control (Bundesamt für Wirtschaft und Ausfuhrkontrolle, short BAFA) is a German federal agency. The BAFA is authorised to make the final decision on whether German goods are permitted for export.

== History ==
The predecessor Bundesamt für Wirtschaft (BAW) (Federal Office of Economics) was founded in 1954. Its original name was Bundesamt für gewerbliche Wirtschaft (Federal Office for Industrial Economics). In 1975 it moved to Eschborn, where in 1975 the Bundesausfuhramt (Federal Office of Export) came into being. Eventually both offices got combined.

BAFA's parent agency is the Federal Ministry of Economics and Technology.

== Responsibilities ==
All items listed by the Australia Group, Missile Technology Control Regime, Nuclear Suppliers Group, and Wassenaar Arrangement are subject to export control in Germany. Germany implements the European Dual Use Export Control Annex. All these control documents are the responsibility of BAFA.

=== Oversight for Arms Trade Treaty ===
The BAFA is tasked with oversight of the Arms Trade Treaty in Germany, and the domestic Kriegswaffenkontrollgesetz (War weapons control act). The BAFA has been entrusted by the Council of the EU with the technical implementation of the EU ATT Outreach Project.

The BAFA receives arms and dual-use export license applications and also uses a consolidated list to determine how the item should be controlled. Germany's consolidated Export List includes a section for arms and one for dual-use items. Some items in the arms section, contained in a specific list known as "war weapons," are subject to additional prohibitions and licensing requirements under the War Weapons Control Act, and are reviewed and approved by another part of the Federal Ministry of Economics and Technology. When applying for an export license to BAFA, applicants have to submit a copy of the war weapons license granted by the Federal Ministry of Economics and Technology if the export is subject to the War Weapons Control Act.

=== Foreign trade ===
The office oversees German exports in general and the export of weaponry and dual-use technology in particular. The BAFA keeps detailed lists of goods which have to be scrutinized before a consent is possible. Hereby it considers embargos and international regulations such as the Chemical Weapons Convention and the Nuclear Suppliers Group.

On behest of the European Union the BAFA also enforces the Union's regulations concerning the import of specific goods including textile and steel.

Moreover, the office supports countries outside the European Union in case they are about to establish their own export control systems.

=== Promotion of economic development ===
The BAFA strives to improve the competitiveness of small and medium enterprises. It promotes management consulting, helps companies to present their products at international trade fairs etc.

=== Energy and environmental protection ===
The main goal is to promote efficient energy use as well as establishing a sustainable energy supply. The office's programmes for that matter pursue for example a growing use of cogeneration. This includes incentives for evolvements in the field of renewable energy on the grounds of solar thermal energy, biomass and heat pumps. The BAFA also offers professional certification for appropriate constructions and consultants for energy conservation.
