= Iran can never have a nuclear weapon =

Political slogan

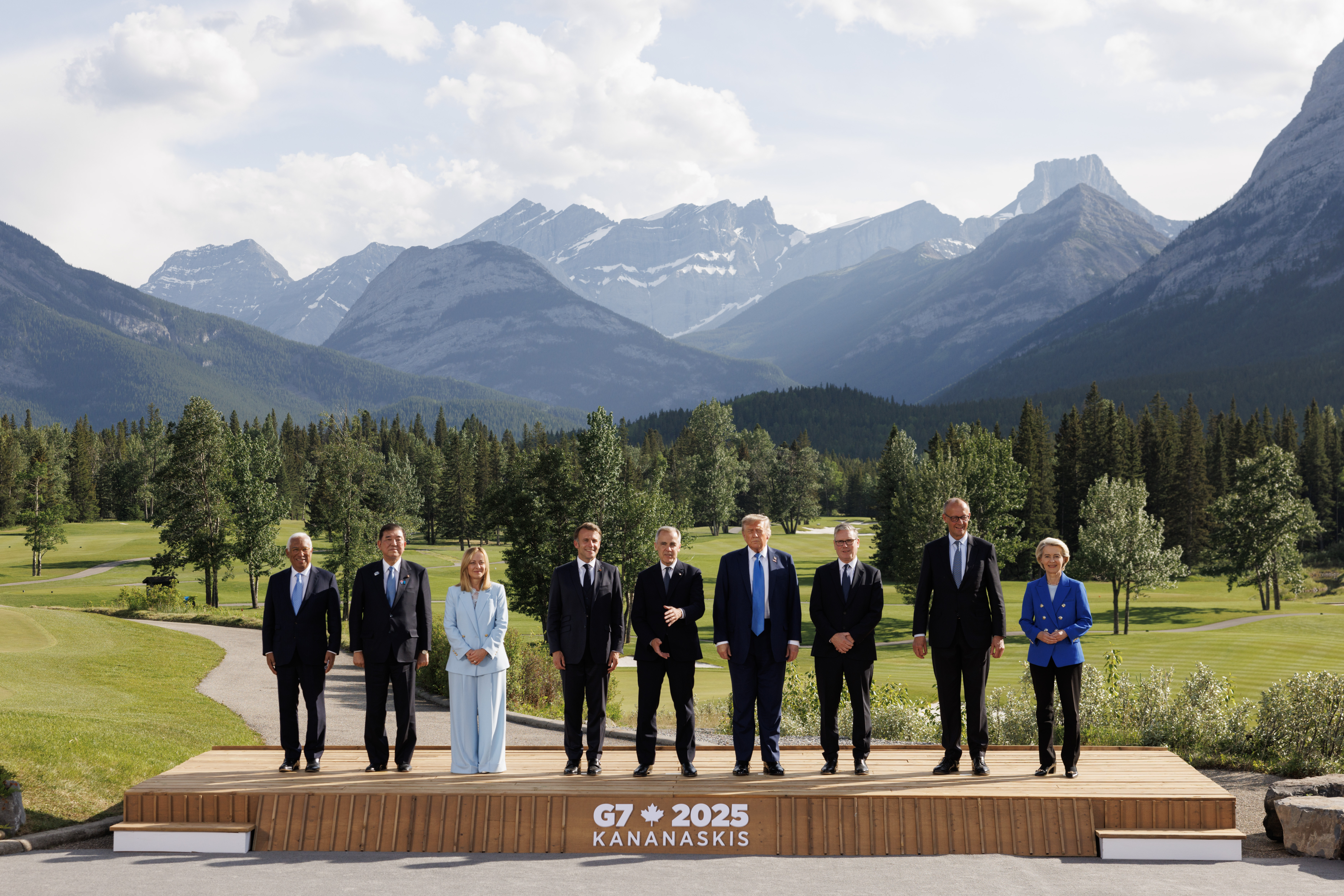
International leaders at the 51st G7 summit, who jointly stated "Iran can never have a nuclear weapon".

"Iran can never have a nuclear weapon" is a political slogan of Israel's government and its international supporters regarding the nuclear program of Iran. It has been used to state an opposition to nuclear proliferation to Iran in the decades following the Iranian Revolution. The notion was a consistent justification, among many others, for Israel and the US initiating the 2026 Iran war. A similar phrase was used by President George W. Bush in 2005.

Arguments in favor of the slogan include the potential for a regional nuclear arms race, with countries such as Saudi Arabia and Turkey. Others include an increase in Iran's alleged sponsoring of terrorism, or the chance of regime change, both of which could lead to nuclear terrorism.

Criticism of the phrase includes a US double standard that ignores Israeli nuclear weapons, that a nuclear-armed Iran would stabilize the Middle East via nuclear deterrence, or that Iran does not seek nuclear weapons.

== History ==
In February 2005, speaking with German Chancellor Gerhard Schröder, US President George W. Bush stated "It's vital that the Iranians hear the world speak with one voice that they shouldn't have a nuclear weapon."

In December 2005, Israeli Prime Minister Ariel Sharon stated Israel "cannot accept a nuclear Iran".

In December 2022, the Council of the European Union stated that "Iran must never be allowed to develop or acquire a nuclear weapon."

On 13 June 2025, Israel launched strikes on Iran beginning the Twelve-Day War, following an International Atomic Energy Agency finding that previous day, that Iran was in non-compliance. On 17 June, the leaders of the G7 nations jointly stated "Iran can never have a nuclear weapon".

On 27 March 2026, one month into the 2026 Iran war, Secretary General of NATO Mark Rutte stated that NATO has been clear that Iran cannot have a nuclear weapon.

== Analysis ==
A nuclear-armed Iran has raised concerns about a regional nuclear arms race, with countries such as Saudi Arabia and Turkey indicating they might pursue nuclear capabilities if Iran were to develop them. Due to Iran's alleged sponsoring of terrorism, Alex S. Wilner of the Center for Security Studies has suggested Iran may provide materials allowing for nuclear terrorism, and Alireza Nader of the RAND Corporation that Iran's nuclear-armed status can be used as soft power to increase its support for conventional terrorism. Charles David Freilich, a former deputy national security adviser in Israel, has argued that Iran may be subject to internal instability or regime change, risking nuclear weapons falling into the hands of extremist factions of violent non-state actors.

== Criticism ==
The US tacit acceptance of Israeli nuclear weapons has been criticized as a double standard in nonproliferation that hinders US negotiations to limit the Iranian nuclear program. This has been seen as unsustainably "implying there are 'right hands' and 'wrong hands' for nuclear weapons".

In 2012, Columbia University political scientist Kenneth Waltz authored the controversial article "Why Iran Should Get the Bomb". Political scientist John Mearsheimer supported Waltz's thesis of greater stability, while US official Dov S. Zakheim argued the chance of proliferation in further countries was unacceptable.

The 2014 book Manufactured Crisis: The Untold Story of the Iran Nuclear Scare by Gareth Porter asserts that Iran's nuclear program has been peaceful, arguing that the evidence widely cited to demonstrate Iran's nuclear weapons ambitions is fabricated by Israel and the United States.

Iran considers itself legally and politically constrained from developing nuclear weapons by instruments including the Treaty on the Non-Proliferation of Nuclear Weapons, and Ali Khamenei's fatwa against nuclear weapons. However, Joseph Klinger writing for the American Society of International Law suggested these are impermanent, as Iran can withdraw from the former and overwrite the latter with a new fatwa, and the only unilateral legal impositions on Iran can come from resolutions of the United Nations Security Council.

== See also ==
- Bomb Iran
- Death to America
