= Kriegswaffenkontrollgesetz =

German war leglislation

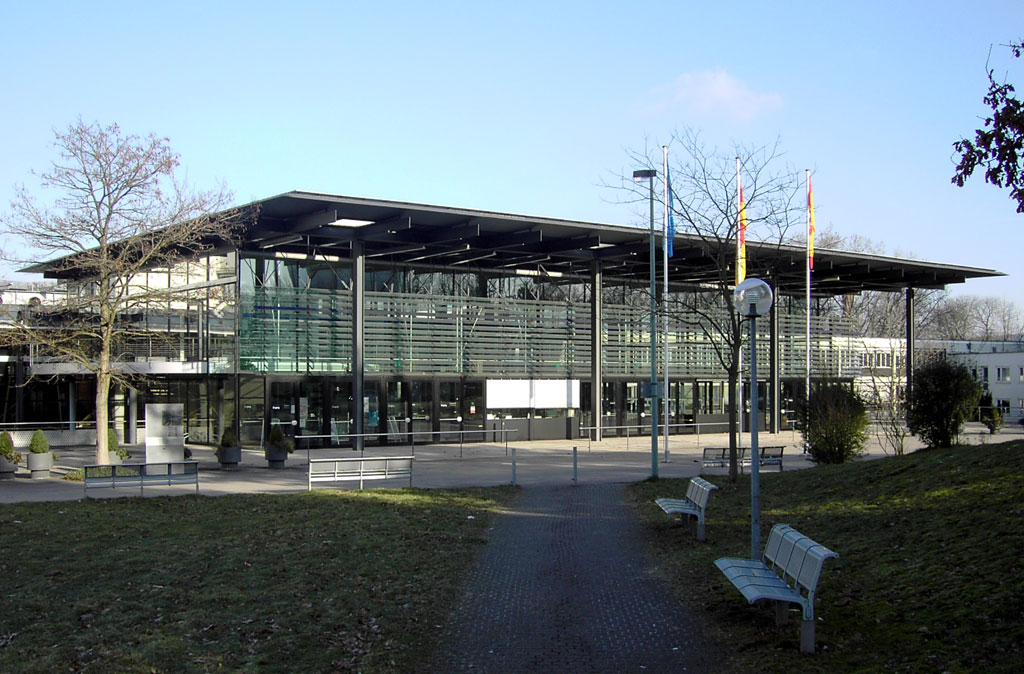

Bundestag
- Long title: Gesetz über die Kontrolle von Kriegswaffen
- Citation: KrWaffKontrG
- Territorial extent: Germany
- Enacted by: Bundestag
- Enacted: 20 April 1961
- Commenced: 1. June 1961
- Status: In force

The German Kriegswaffenkontrollgesetz (Weapons of War Control Act) controls the production, handover, sale, trade, acquisition and transport of goods, resources, and organisms that are meant for war. During the 2022 Russian invasion of Ukraine the law suddenly became very relevant, because the German policy on sending weapons is in part based on this law.

== History ==
The 1949 German Basic Law for the Federal Republic of Germany was heavily influenced by World War II. It therefore got an article 26 with two parts. Paragraph one declared that the preparation of an offensive war was at odds with the constitution and would be made punishable.

Paragraph two of article 26 determines that weapons of war may only be produced and traded with the approval of the federal government. A federal law (Bundesgesetz) has to determine the details. The Gesetz über die Kontrolle von Kriegswaffen, abbreviated Kriegswaffenkontrollgesetz is the law that article 26 paragraph 2 refers to. It was approved and published in 1961.

== Workings ==
=== Procedure ===
The Kriegswaffenkontrollgesetz has several articles and parts that are indeed aligned with the philosophy of the basic law. The idea is that the internal peace of Germany and peace in general have to be protected by controlling the availability and proliferation of weapons of war. The mechanism to do this is, is by making the legality of many activities dependent on a government permit Die Genehmigung. Exercising these activities without such a permit is a very serious criminal offense.

The Kriegswaffenkontrollgesetz declares that the federal government gives and cancel permits, but allows delegation. Therefore, the primary authority for permits is the Federal Ministry for Economic Affairs and Climate Action. The import and export of weapons is checked by the Federal Office of Economics and Export Control (BAFA), e.g. by regularly checking the weapons books Kriegswaffenbuch.

=== Activities that require a permit ===
Anybody who wants to produce weapons of war has to acquire a permit from the federal government.

Anybody who wants to transfer or acquire possession of weapons of war requires a permit from the federal government.

The transport of weapons of war on the territory of the Federal Republic requires a permit. General permits can be issued for things like deliveries to the German army.

The export of weapons of war requires a permit. A general permit for export is only possible for exports to certified companies in other member states of the European Union.

If the above activities are exercised without the required permit, they constitute criminal offenses. In general the maximum punishment for these activities is five years in prison. The actual punishment is significantly more severe than for acting contrary to the Außenwirtschaftsgesetz.

There is a general exclusion for devices, parts, resources and organisms for civilian use. Another exclusion for these things applies when they are used for scientific, health or industrial research in theoretic or applied sciences.

== Weapons of war ==
The Kriegswaffenkontrollgesetz has a list of goods it considers to be weapons:

- Nuclear weapons and parts of these
- Biological weapons, and specifically a long list of Biological agents, like many kinds of viruses, and toxins.
- Chemical weapons, with a long list of substances
- Missiles, including e.g. Anti-tank guided missiles
- Military aircraft and parts
- Military Helicopters
- Warships
- Tanks including their chassis and turrets
- Machine guns; Submachine guns Maschinenpistole; automatic rifles; and semi-automatic firearms with the exception of some older models
- Grenade launchers
- Cannon, Howitzers, Mortars
- Autocannon
- Carriages and barrels for the above gun-type weapons
- Portable low recoil unguided Anti-tank weapons
- Flamethrowers
- Systems to lay land mines and mine delivery systems
- Torpedoes, bombs, land mines, hand grenades, cluster ammunition (Streuwaffen)
- Heavy ammunition
- Small arms ammunition, except for some kinds of full metal jacket ammunition of calibers that are also used in sport or hunting
- Laser weapons, designed to cause permanent blindness.

== Effects ==
=== Policy ===
The Kriegswaffenkontrollgesetz gives the German government the authority to forbid or permit almost all activities of the German arms industry. Therefore, a policy is needed to give the industry some certainty about what will be allowed.

Another law that has such a construction is the außenwirtschaftsgesetz, which also allows to make further regulations to limit the proliferation of German arms. In the Außenwirtschaftsverordnung paragraph 21–6, the Bundesamt für Wirtschaft und Ausfuhrkontrolle (BAFA) got the authority to make a further regulation. In the "Bekanntmachung über Endverbleibsdokumente nach § 21 Absatz 6 der Außenwirtschaftsverordnung (AWV)" the BAFA stipulates that every arms export requires an End-user certificate which forbids re-export without permission.

The policy for both the permissions based on the Kriegswaffenkontrollgesetz and for the permissions based on the außenwirtschaftsgesetz are bundled in one policy document. This makes it clear that there is a single policy for deciding on both permits, but of course these are not the same permit.

=== Shortcomings ===
There are some critics of the effectiveness of the Kriegswaffenkontrollgesetz. It would be too easy to evade because for many goods and uses it is not immediately clear that the law applies. It therefore requires additional rules, like e.g. in the Außenwirtschaftsgesetz. The law offers insufficient control exported production licenses, in particular when they expire. The Kriegswaffenkontrollgesetz is also in competition to other laws, especially on the level of the European Union, and it therefore leads to legal uncertainty.

=== Rüstungsexportkontrollgesetz ===
Already in April 2021, the federal government had made a design for a new Rüstungsexportkontrollgesetz (Arms Export Control law). In November 2021 those who thought that the Kriegswaffenkontrollgesetz did not impose enough limitations on German arms exports could celebrate a success as the Traffic light coalition that was formed at the time, made issuing the new law part of the coalition agreement.

=== 2022 Russian invasion of Ukraine ===
Before 2022, Germany had a long-standing policy of not allowing the export of weapons to countries that are involved in an armed conflict. The proposed Rüstungsexportkontrollgesetz would also forbid this.

Within a few days of the 24 February 2022 Russian invasion of Ukraine, the German government began to send small arms to Ukraine. It is part of a fundamental change in Germany's foreign policy, marked by Olaf Scholz's 27 February 2022 Zeitenwende speech. This policy change will also lead to a different Rüstungsexportkontrollgesetz. Plans are to explicitly prescribe that Germany can help countries that are in armed conflict, based on the values that underpin German foreign policy, the goals of the UN charter, international law, and the fundamental right of self defenses.

In the complex matter of sending weapons to Ukraine three different situations can be discerned:

- The German government orders its armed forces to send weapons to Ukraine: A Kriegswaffenkontrollgesetz permit is not required, as the government is checked by the Bundestag, which will check whether this is sound policy.
- Ukraine orders weapons in Germany or the government orders a company to send arms: the Kriegswaffenkontrollgesetz requires permits.
- Other countries want to supply Ukraine with weapons that they have imported from Germany: The German government has to give (or deny) re-export permission based on the außenwirtschaftsgesetz.

== See also ==
- Arms Export Control Act the United States law on the same subject.
