= Turquzabad =

Village in Tehran province, Iran

Turquzabad Persian: تورقوزآباد
- Village
- Location within Iran
- Coordinates: 35°30′15″N 51°17′26″E
- Country: Iran
- Province: Tehran
- County: Ray
- District: Kahrizak
- Rural District: Kahrizak

Population (2016)
  - Total: 2,278
- Time zone: UTC+3:30 (IRST)

Turquzabad (Persian: تورقوزآباد) (Note: Also romanized as Ţūrqūzābād) is a village in Kahrizak Rural District of Kahrizak District in Ray County, Tehran province, Iran.

== Demographics ==
=== Population ===
At the time of the 2006 National Census, the village's population was 2,803 in 669 households. The following census in 2011 counted 2,988 people in 780 households. The 2016 census measured the population of the village as 2,278 people in 654 households.

== Atomic warehouse ==
On 27 September 2018, Israeli Prime Minister Benjamin Netanyahu showed the UN General Assembly a photo of an alleged nuclear storage facility in Turquzabad. On 8 September 2019, nearly a year after Netanyahu's claim, Reuters reported quoting two diplomats close to the International Atomic Energy Agency as saying that uranium samples were found at the site.
