= Ursa Minor in Chinese astronomy =

According to traditional Chinese uranography, the modern constellation Ursa Minor is located in Three Enclosures (三垣, Sān Yuán)

The name of the western constellation in modern Chinese is 小熊座 (xiǎo xióng zuò), meaning "the little bear constellation".

== Stars ==
The map of Ursa Minor in the Chinese constellation:

Enclosures	Enclosure (Chinese name)	Romanization	Translation	Asterisms (Chinese name)	Romanization	Translation	Western star name	Proper Name	Chinese star name	Romanization	Translation
Three Enclosures (三垣)	紫微垣	Zǐ Wēi Yuán	Purple Forbidden enclosure	北極	Běijí	Northern Pole					
Three Enclosures (三垣)	紫微垣	Zǐ Wēi Yuán	Purple Forbidden enclosure	北極	Běijí	Northern Pole	γ UMi	Pherkad			
Three Enclosures (三垣)	紫微垣	Zǐ Wēi Yuán	Purple Forbidden enclosure	北極	Běijí	Northern Pole	γ UMi	Pherkad	北極一	Běijíyī	1st star
Three Enclosures (三垣)	紫微垣	Zǐ Wēi Yuán	Purple Forbidden enclosure	北極	Běijí	Northern Pole	γ UMi	Pherkad	太子	Tàizǐ	The Crown Prince
Three Enclosures (三垣)	紫微垣	Zǐ Wēi Yuán	Purple Forbidden enclosure	北極	Běijí	Northern Pole	β UMi	Kochab			
Three Enclosures (三垣)	紫微垣	Zǐ Wēi Yuán	Purple Forbidden enclosure	北極	Běijí	Northern Pole	β UMi	Kochab	北極二	Běijíèr	2nd star
Three Enclosures (三垣)	紫微垣	Zǐ Wēi Yuán	Purple Forbidden enclosure	北極	Běijí	Northern Pole	β UMi	Kochab	帝	Dì	The Emperor
Three Enclosures (三垣)	紫微垣	Zǐ Wēi Yuán	Purple Forbidden enclosure	北極	Běijí	Northern Pole	β UMi	Kochab	帝座	Dìzuò	The emperor seat
Three Enclosures (三垣)	紫微垣	Zǐ Wēi Yuán	Purple Forbidden enclosure	北極	Běijí	Northern Pole	β UMi	Kochab	帝王	Dìwáng	The monarch
Three Enclosures (三垣)	紫微垣	Zǐ Wēi Yuán	Purple Forbidden enclosure	北極	Běijí	Northern Pole	β UMi	Kochab	昊天上帝	Hàotiānshàngdì	God in the clear sky
Three Enclosures (三垣)	紫微垣	Zǐ Wēi Yuán	Purple Forbidden enclosure	北極	Běijí	Northern Pole	β UMi	Kochab	皇天上帝	Huángtiānshàngdì	Emperor God in the sky
Three Enclosures (三垣)	紫微垣	Zǐ Wēi Yuán	Purple Forbidden enclosure	北極	Běijí	Northern Pole	β UMi	Kochab	皇天上帝	Huángtiānshàngdì	Emperor God in the sky
Three Enclosures (三垣)	紫微垣	Zǐ Wēi Yuán	Purple Forbidden enclosure	北極	Běijí	Northern Pole	β UMi	Kochab	上帝	Shàngdì	God
Three Enclosures (三垣)	紫微垣	Zǐ Wēi Yuán	Purple Forbidden enclosure	北極	Běijí	Northern Pole	β UMi	Kochab	天皇帝	Tiānhuangdì	Celestial emperor
Three Enclosures (三垣)	紫微垣	Zǐ Wēi Yuán	Purple Forbidden enclosure	北極	Běijí	Northern Pole	β UMi	Kochab	天帝	Tiāndì	God of heaven
Three Enclosures (三垣)	紫微垣	Zǐ Wēi Yuán	Purple Forbidden enclosure	北極	Běijí	Northern Pole	β UMi	Kochab	天皇大帝	Tiānhuángdàdì	Great emperor of heaven
Three Enclosures (三垣)	紫微垣	Zǐ Wēi Yuán	Purple Forbidden enclosure	北極	Běijí	Northern Pole	β UMi	Kochab	大帝	Dàdì	Great emperor
Three Enclosures (三垣)	紫微垣	Zǐ Wēi Yuán	Purple Forbidden enclosure	北極	Běijí	Northern Pole	β UMi	Kochab	天极	Tiānjí	Celestial pole
Three Enclosures (三垣)	紫微垣	Zǐ Wēi Yuán	Purple Forbidden enclosure	北極	Běijí	Northern Pole	β UMi	Kochab	大恒	Dàhéng	The big and permanent (star)
Three Enclosures (三垣)	紫微垣	Zǐ Wēi Yuán	Purple Forbidden enclosure	北極	Běijí	Northern Pole	β UMi	Kochab	太恒	Tàihéng	The great and permanent (star)
Three Enclosures (三垣)	紫微垣	Zǐ Wēi Yuán	Purple Forbidden enclosure	北極	Běijí	Northern Pole	5 UMi				
Three Enclosures (三垣)	紫微垣	Zǐ Wēi Yuán	Purple Forbidden enclosure	北極	Běijí	Northern Pole	5 UMi		北極三	Běijísān	3rd star
Three Enclosures (三垣)	紫微垣	Zǐ Wēi Yuán	Purple Forbidden enclosure	北極	Běijí	Northern Pole	5 UMi		庶子	Shùzǐ	The Son of Concubine
Three Enclosures (三垣)	紫微垣	Zǐ Wēi Yuán	Purple Forbidden enclosure	北極	Běijí	Northern Pole	4 UMi				
Three Enclosures (三垣)	紫微垣	Zǐ Wēi Yuán	Purple Forbidden enclosure	北極	Běijí	Northern Pole	4 UMi		北極四	Běijísì	4th star
Three Enclosures (三垣)	紫微垣	Zǐ Wēi Yuán	Purple Forbidden enclosure	北極	Běijí	Northern Pole	4 UMi		後宮	Hòugōng	The Concubine
Three Enclosures (三垣)	紫微垣	Zǐ Wēi Yuán	Purple Forbidden enclosure	北極	Běijí	Northern Pole	3 UMi		庶子增二	Shùzǐzēngèr	2nd additional star of The Son of Concubine
Three Enclosures (三垣)	紫微垣	Zǐ Wēi Yuán	Purple Forbidden enclosure	北極	Běijí	Northern Pole	10 UMi		庶子增三	Shùzǐzēngsān	3rd additional star of The Son of Concubine
Three Enclosures (三垣)	紫微垣	Zǐ Wēi Yuán	Purple Forbidden enclosure	天床	Tiānchuáng	Celestial Bed					
Three Enclosures (三垣)	紫微垣	Zǐ Wēi Yuán	Purple Forbidden enclosure	天床	Tiānchuáng	Celestial Bed	HD 124730		天床一	Tiānchuángyī	1st star
Three Enclosures (三垣)	紫微垣	Zǐ Wēi Yuán	Purple Forbidden enclosure	天床	Tiānchuáng	Celestial Bed	HD 136064		天床二	Tiānchuángèr	2nd star
Three Enclosures (三垣)	紫微垣	Zǐ Wēi Yuán	Purple Forbidden enclosure	天床	Tiānchuáng	Celestial Bed	RR UMi		天床五	Tiānchuángwǔ	5th star
Three Enclosures (三垣)	紫微垣	Zǐ Wēi Yuán	Purple Forbidden enclosure	天床	Tiānchuáng	Celestial Bed	6 UMi		天床六	Tiānchuángliù	6th star
Three Enclosures (三垣)	紫微垣	Zǐ Wēi Yuán	Purple Forbidden enclosure	天床	Tiānchuáng	Celestial Bed	9 UMi		天床增一	Tiānchuángzēngyī	1st additional star
Three Enclosures (三垣)	紫微垣	Zǐ Wēi Yuán	Purple Forbidden enclosure	天床	Tiānchuáng	Celestial Bed	11 UMi	Pherkad Minor	天床增二	Tiānchuángzēngèr	2nd additional star
Three Enclosures (三垣)	紫微垣	Zǐ Wēi Yuán	Purple Forbidden enclosure	勾陳	Gòuchén	Curved Array					
Three Enclosures (三垣)	紫微垣	Zǐ Wēi Yuán	Purple Forbidden enclosure	勾陳	Gòuchén	Curved Array	α UMi	Polaris			
Three Enclosures (三垣)	紫微垣	Zǐ Wēi Yuán	Purple Forbidden enclosure	勾陳	Gòuchén	Curved Array	α UMi	Polaris	勾陳一	Gòuchényī	1st star
Three Enclosures (三垣)	紫微垣	Zǐ Wēi Yuán	Purple Forbidden enclosure	勾陳	Gòuchén	Curved Array	α UMi	Polaris	勾陳大星	Gòuchéndàxīng	Big star
Three Enclosures (三垣)	紫微垣	Zǐ Wēi Yuán	Purple Forbidden enclosure	勾陳	Gòuchén	Curved Array	δ UMi	Yildun	勾陳二	Gòuchénèr	2nd star
Three Enclosures (三垣)	紫微垣	Zǐ Wēi Yuán	Purple Forbidden enclosure	勾陳	Gòuchén	Curved Array	ε UMi		勾陳三	Gòuchénsān	3rd star
Three Enclosures (三垣)	紫微垣	Zǐ Wēi Yuán	Purple Forbidden enclosure	勾陳	Gòuchén	Curved Array	ζ UMi		勾陳四	Gòuchénsì	4th star
Three Enclosures (三垣)	紫微垣	Zǐ Wēi Yuán	Purple Forbidden enclosure	勾陳	Gòuchén	Curved Array	λ UMi		勾陳增五	Gòuchénzēngwǔ	5th additional star
Three Enclosures (三垣)	紫微垣	Zǐ Wēi Yuán	Purple Forbidden enclosure	勾陳	Gòuchén	Curved Array	24 UMi		勾陳增六	Gòuchénzēngliù	6th additional star
Three Enclosures (三垣)	紫微垣	Zǐ Wēi Yuán	Purple Forbidden enclosure	勾陳	Gòuchén	Curved Array	θ UMi		勾陳增七	Gòuchénzēngqī	7th additional star
Three Enclosures (三垣)	紫微垣	Zǐ Wēi Yuán	Purple Forbidden enclosure	勾陳	Gòuchén	Curved Array	19 UMi		勾陳增八	Gòuchénzēngbā	8th additional star
Three Enclosures (三垣)	紫微垣	Zǐ Wēi Yuán	Purple Forbidden enclosure	勾陳	Gòuchén	Curved Array	η UMi		勾陳增九	Gòuchénzēngjiǔ	9th additional star
Three Enclosures (三垣)	紫微垣	Zǐ Wēi Yuán	Purple Forbidden enclosure	勾陳	Gòuchén	Curved Array	20 UMi		勾陳增十	Gòuchénzēngshí	10th additional star

== See also ==
- Traditional Chinese star names
- Chinese constellations
