= Northern Pole =

Chinese historical constellation

Northern Pole (北极 in Simplified Chinese, běi jí in Pinyin) is a traditional Chinese asterism found in the Purple Forbidden enclosure (紫微垣 in Simplified Chinese, zǐ wēi yuán in Pinyin). It consists of five stars found in the modern constellations of Ursa Minor and Camelopardalis and represents the five stars of the North Pole. During the Qing dynasty, a total of four stars from the constellation Ursa Minor was added to the asterism.

Order	English name	Chinese name	Corresponding star
1 (北极一)	The Crown Prince	太子	Gamma Ursae Minoris (Pherkad)
2 (北极二)	The Emperor	帝	Beta Ursae Minoris (Kochab)
3 (北极三)	The Son of Concubine	庶子	5 Ursae Minoris
3+1 (庶子增一)	The Son of Concubine	庶子	unclear, in Ursa Minor
3+2 (庶子增二)	The Son of Concubine	庶子	3 Ursae Minoris
3+3 (庶子增三)	The Son of Concubine	庶子	10 Ursae Minoris
4 (北极四)	The Concubine	后宫	4 Ursae Minoris
4+1 (后宫增一)	The Concubine	后宫	unclear, in Ursa Minor
5 (北极五)	The Celestial Pivot	天枢	Struve 1694 (in Camelopardalis)
