= NGC 5314 =

Galaxy in the constellation Ursa Minor

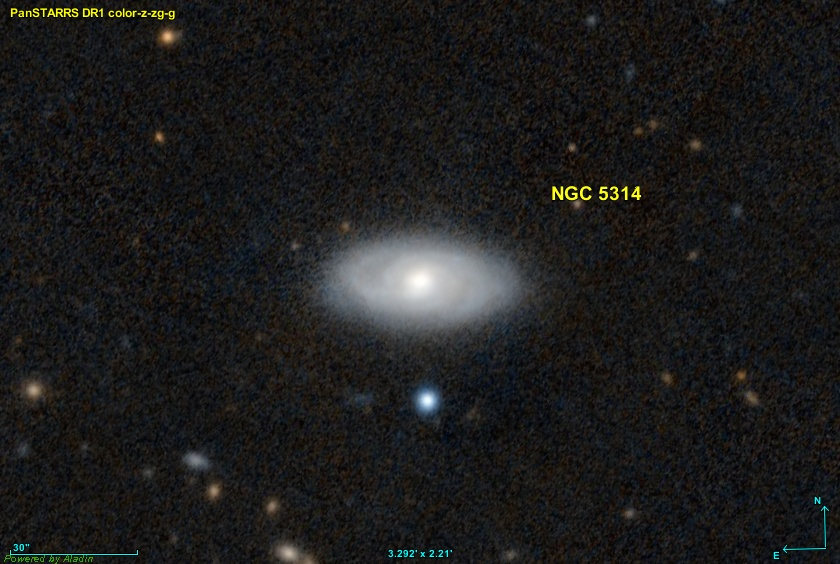
- NGC 5314 imaged by Pan-STARRS

Observation data (J2000 epoch)
- Constellation: Ursa Minor
- Right ascension: 13^{h} 46^{m} 11.4159^{s}
- Declination: +70° 20′ 22.234″
- Redshift: 0.031962
- Heliocentric radial velocity: 9582 ± 100 km/s
- Distance: 463.6 ± 33.2 Mly (142.13 ± 10.17 Mpc)
- Apparent magnitude (V): 13.9

Characteristics
- Type: Sbc?
- Size: ~170,400 ly (52.23 kpc) (estimated)
- Apparent size (V): 1.0′ × 0.5′

Other designations
- IRAS 13450+7035, 2MASX J13461136+7020225, MCG +12-13-009, PGC 48810, CGCG 336-017

NGC 5314 is a spiral galaxy in the constellation of Ursa Minor. Its velocity with respect to the cosmic microwave background is 9636 ± 100 km/s, which corresponds to a Hubble distance of 142.13 ± 10.17 Mpc (~463 million light-years). It was discovered by American astronomer Lewis Swift on 8 April 1886.

One supernova has been observed in NGC 5314: SN 2023eyz (Type Ia, mag. 20.41) was discovered by the Zwicky Transient Facility on 8 April 2023.

== See also ==
- List of NGC objects (5001–6000)
