= Eta Ursae Minoris =

Star of the Ursa Minor constellation

- Location of η Ursae Minoris (circled)

Observation data Epoch J2000.0 Equinox J2000.0 (ICRS)
- Constellation: Ursa Minor
- Right ascension: 16^{h} 17^{m} 30.27025^{s}
- Declination: +75° 45′ 19.2351″
- Apparent magnitude (V): +4.95

Characteristics
- Evolutionary stage: main sequence
- Spectral type: F5 V
- U−B color index: +0.02
- B−V color index: +0.35

Astrometry
Radial velocity (R_{v})	−11.0±0.9 km/s
Proper motion (μ)	RA: −77.647 mas/yr Dec.: +245.726 mas/yr
Parallax (π)	33.4190±0.1103 mas
Distance	97.6 ± 0.3 ly (29.92 ± 0.10 pc)
Absolute magnitude (M_{V})	+2.61

Details
Mass	1.539 M_{☉}
Radius	2.024 R_{☉}
Luminosity	7.725 L_{☉}
Surface gravity (log g)	4.15±0.14 cgs
Temperature	6,764 K
Metallicity [Fe/H]	−0.02 dex
Rotational velocity (v sin i)	84.8 km/s
Age	1.743 Gyr

Other designations
- η UMi, 21 Ursae Minoris, BD+76°596, FK5 612, GC 21999, HD 148048, HIP 79822, HR 6116, SAO 8470, CCDM 16176+7545

Database references
SIMBAD	data

Eta Ursae Minoris (Latinized from η Ursae Minoris) is a yellow-white hued star in the northern circumpolar constellation of Ursa Minor.

This is an F-type main-sequence star of stellar classification F5 V with an apparent magnitude of +4.95, making it faintly visible to the naked eye. Based upon an annual parallax shift of 33.4 mas as seen from the Earth, it is located 98 light years from the Sun. The star is moving closer to the Sun with a radial velocity of −11 km/s, and is traversing the sky with a relatively high proper motion of 0.271 arc seconds per year.

Eta Ursae Minoris is about 1.7 billion years old and has 1.54 times the mass of the Sun. It has a high rate of spin with a projected rotational velocity of 84.8 km/s. These coordinates mark a source of X-ray emission with a luminosity of 11.5×10^{28} erg s^{−1}. Eta Ursae Minoris may form a wide binary system with a magnitude 15.3 companion star, located at an angular separation of 228.5 arc seconds.

In some Arabic star charts it is labeled انور الفرقدين ʼanwar al-farqadayn, "the brighter of the two calves", and paired with ζ Ursae Minoris as اخفي الفرقدين akhfā al-farkadain "the dimmer of the two calves". The names may originally refer to a pair of Ibexes, and are more properly applied to β UMi and γ UMi respectively, the brighter two stars in the rectangle of Ursa Minor.
