= NGC 5671 =

Galaxy in the constellation Ursa Minor

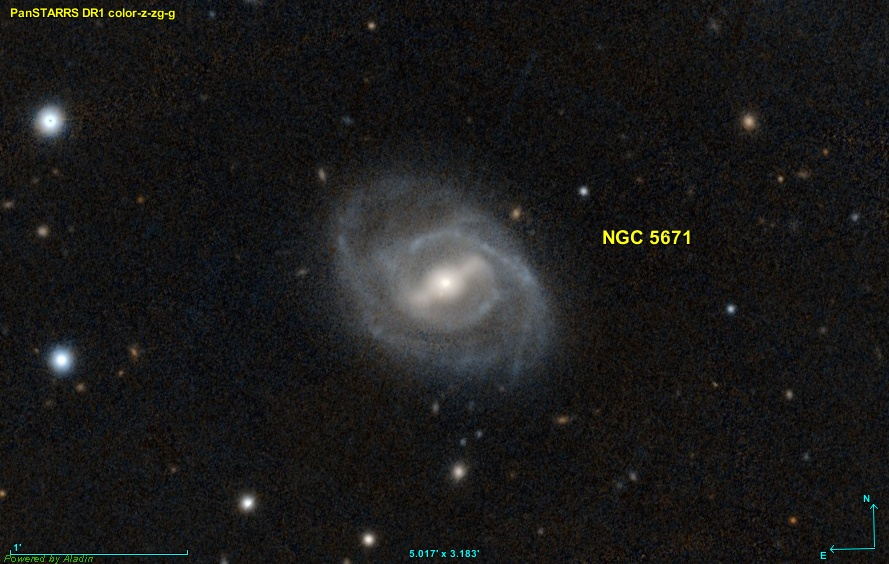
- NGC 5671 imaged by Pan-STARRS

Observation data (J2000 epoch)
- Constellation: Ursa Minor
- Right ascension: 14^{h} 27^{m} 42.0426^{s}
- Declination: +69° 41′ 38.703″
- Redshift: 0.030074±0.000143
- Heliocentric radial velocity: 9,016±43 km/s
- Distance: 353.75 ± 10.07 Mly (108.460 ± 3.086 Mpc)
- Apparent magnitude (V): 14.10

Characteristics
- Type: SB(r)b
- Size: ~211,000 ly (64.68 kpc) (estimated)
- Apparent size (V): 1.7′ × 1.2′

Other designations
- IRAS F14269+6954, UGC 9297, MCG +12-14-006, PGC 51641, CGCG 337-014

NGC 5671 is a large barred spiral galaxy in the constellation of Ursa Minor. Its velocity with respect to the cosmic microwave background is 9,058±43 km/s, which corresponds to a Hubble distance of 435.7 ± 30.6 Mly (133.59 ± 9.39 Mpc). However, five non-redshift measurements give a closer mean distance of 353.75 ± 10.07 Mly (108.460 ± 3.086 Mpc). It was discovered by German-British astronomer William Herschel on 6 May 1791.

According to Abraham Mahtessian, NGC 5671 and UGC 9295 form a pair of galaxies.

== Supernovae ==
Two supernovae have been observed in NGC 5671:

- SN 2008be (Type IIn, mag. 18.5) was discovered by the Lick Observatory Supernova Search (LOSS) on 12 March 2008.
- SN 2020dya (Type II, mag. 19.11) was discovered by the Zwicky Transient Facility on 4 March 2020.

== See also ==
- List of NGC objects (5001–6000)
