= Ursa constellation =

There are two Bear constellations:

- Ursa Major (Great Bear), contains the Big Dipper
- Ursa Minor (Small Bear), contains the Little Dipper
