= NGC 6217 =

Galaxy in the constellation Ursa Minor

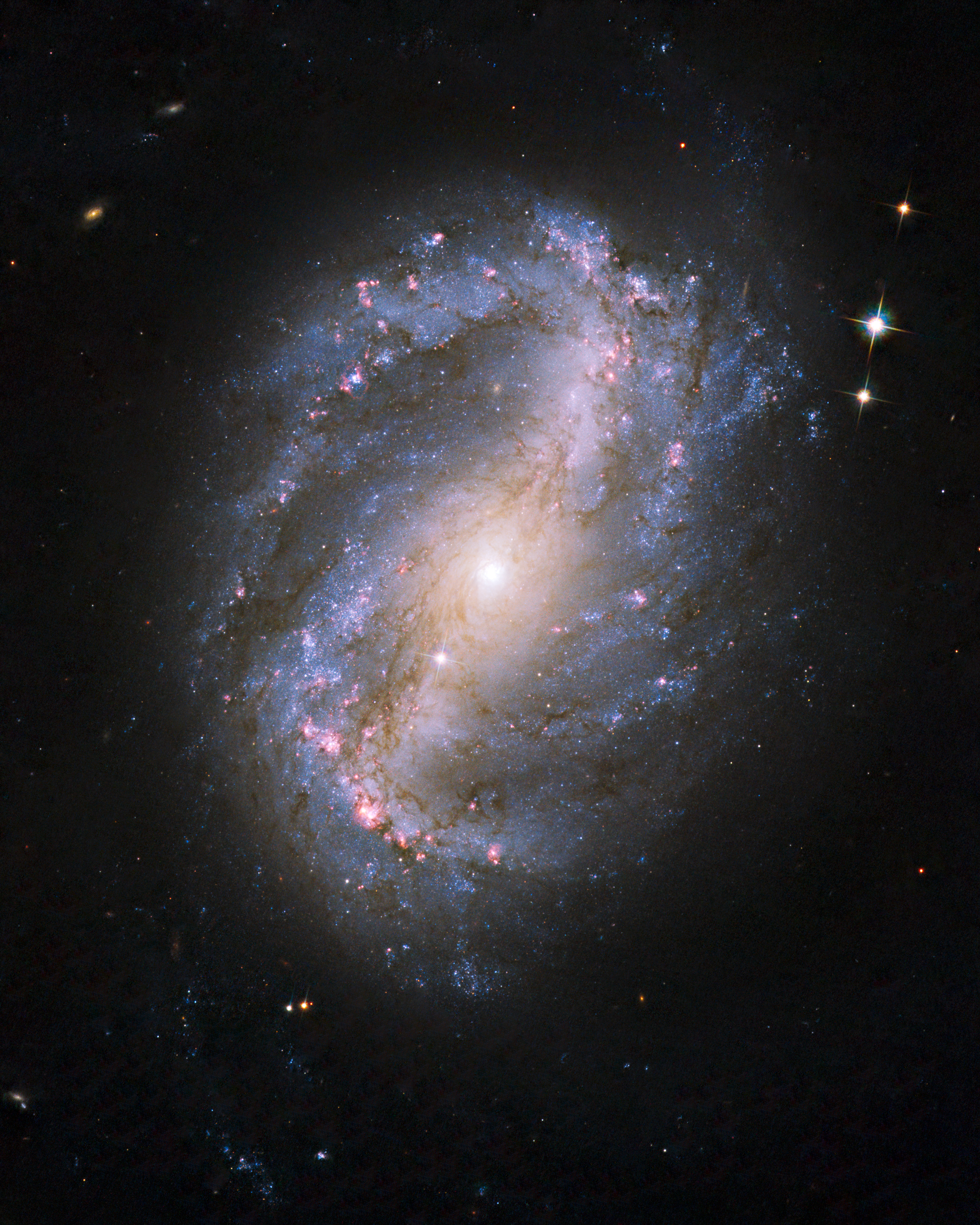
- NGC 6217 imaged by the Hubble Space Telescope

Observation data (J2000 epoch)
- Constellation: Ursa Minor
- Right ascension: 16^{h} 32^{m} 39.217^{s}
- Declination: +78° 11′ 53.56″
- Redshift: 0.004543 ± 0.000013
- Heliocentric radial velocity: 1,368 km/s
- Distance: 67.2 Mly (20.6 Mpc)
- Apparent magnitude (V): 11.2

Characteristics
- Type: (R)SB(rs)bc
- Apparent size (V): 55,000 light years

Other designations
- ARP 185, UGC 10470

NGC 6217 is a barred spiral galaxy located some 67 million light years away, in the constellation Ursa Minor. It can be located with a 10 cm (4 in) or larger telescope as an 11th magnitude object about 2.5° east-northeast of the star Zeta Ursae Minoris. The galaxy is inclined by an angle of 33° to the line of sight along a position angle of 162°.

A morphological classification of (R')SB(rs)bc indicates that NGC 6217 has a false outer ring-like structure formed from the spiral arms (R'), a well-defined bar running across the nucleus (SB), a partial inner ring (rs), and moderately-wound spiral arms (bc). The nucleus is spherical in shape, showing no indication of oblateness. The prominent bar spans an angular distance of 48″ (48 arc seconds) across the galaxy along a position angle of 35.97° ± 0.35°. At 10″ southeast of the nucleus is a prominent region of star formation. The inner ring is about 43″.5 across.

NGC 6217 has been characterized as a starburst galaxy, which means it is undergoing a high rate of star formation compared to a typical galaxy. As a result, the spectrum is dominated by stellar photoionization from young, hot stars. This component is less than 10 million years old, producing a blue-hued spectral continuum with absorption weak lines from elements other than hydrogen and helium. At the core of the galaxy is a low-luminosity active galactic nucleus which has formed an H II region.

== Supernova ==
One supernova has been observed in NGC 6217: SN 2018gj (Type II, mag 14.6) was discovered by Patrick Wiggins on 14 January 2018.

== Gallery ==
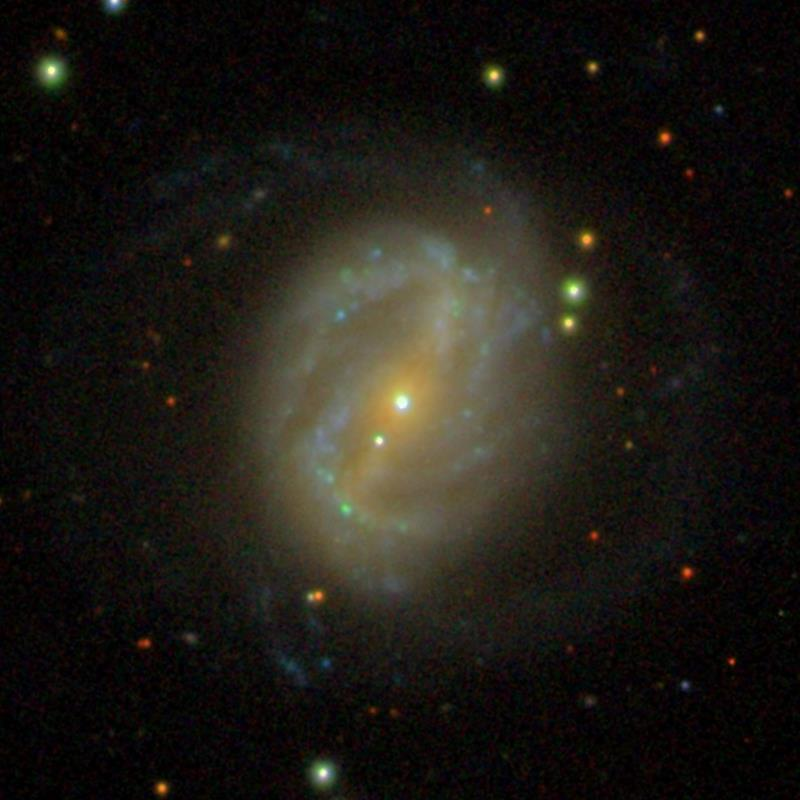
SDSS

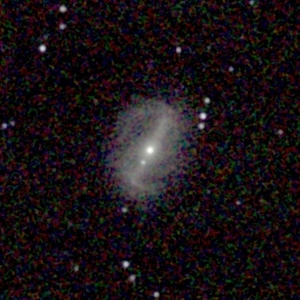
2MASS (near-infrared)
