= WISE 1506+7027 =

Star in the constellation Ursa Minor

WISEPC J150649.97+702736.0
- Location of WISE 1506+7027 in the constellation Ursa Minor

Observation data Epoch J2000 Equinox ICRS
- Constellation: Ursa Minor
- Right ascension: 15^{h} 06^{m} 52.4406^{s}
- Declination: +70° 27′ 25.151″

Characteristics
- Evolutionary stage: brown dwarf
- Spectral type: T6
- Apparent magnitude (J (2MASS filter system)): 14.328±0.095
- Apparent magnitude (J (MKO filter system)): 13.56±0.05
- Apparent magnitude (H (2MASS filter system)): 14.150±0.203
- Apparent magnitude (H (MKO filter system)): 13.91±0.04
- Apparent magnitude (K_{S} (2MASS filter system)): 14.048±0.136

Astrometry
Proper motion (μ)	RA: −1,194.179 mas/yr Dec.: +1,042.194 mas/yr
Parallax (π)	193.5±0.6 mas
Distance	16.86 ± 0.05 ly (5.17 ± 0.02 pc)

Details
Temperature	952 K

Other designations
- WISEPC J150649.97+702736.0, WISE J1506+7027, WISE 1506+7027

Database references
SIMBAD	data

WISEPC J150649.97+702736.0 (designation abbreviated to WISE 1506+7027, or WISE J1506+7027) is a brown dwarf of spectral class T6, located in the constellation Ursa Minor. It is the nearest known star or brown dwarf in this constellation. It is one of the Sun's nearest neighbors, at a distance of 16.85 light-years. Brown dwarfs closer to the Sun include Luhman 16, WISE 0855−0714, ε Indi Ba and ε Indi Bb.

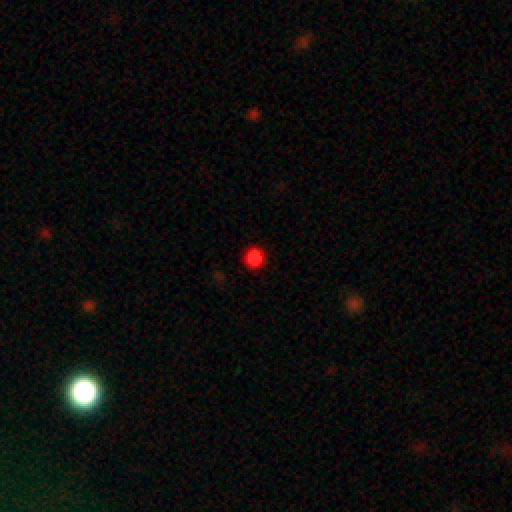
WISE 1506+7027 with the legacy surveys

WISE 1506+7027 was discovered in 2011 from data collected by the Wide-field Infrared Survey Explorer (WISE) in the infrared at a wavelength of 40 cm (16 in), whose mission lasted from December 2009 to February 2011. In 2011, Kirkpatrick and colleagues published a paper in The Astrophysical Journal Supplement, where they presented the discovery of 98 new brown dwarf systems found by WISE with components of spectral types M, L, T and Y, among which was WISE 1506+7027. (Note: These 98 brown dwarf systems are only among first, not all brown dwarf systems, discovered from data, collected by WISE: six discoveries were published earlier (however, also listed in Kirkpatrick et al. (2011)), in Mainzer et al. (2011), and Burgasser et al. (2011), and the other discoveries were published later.)

The first trigonometric parallax of WISE 1506+7027, which was published in 2013 by Marsh et al., is 0.310″±0.042″, corresponding to a distance of 3.4+0.7
−0.4 pc, or 11.1+2.3
−1.3 ly. The Gaia spacecraft determined an updated parallax of 193.5 milliarcseconds leading to a distance of 16.85 light years. WISE 1506+7027 has a large proper motion of about 1,587 milliarcseconds per year.

A 2024 catalog of stars and brown dwarfs within 20 parsecs lists this object with the name "Thompson's Dwarf", but this name does not appear in any other source and its origin is unclear.
