= S Ursae Minoris =

Star in the constellation Ursa Minor

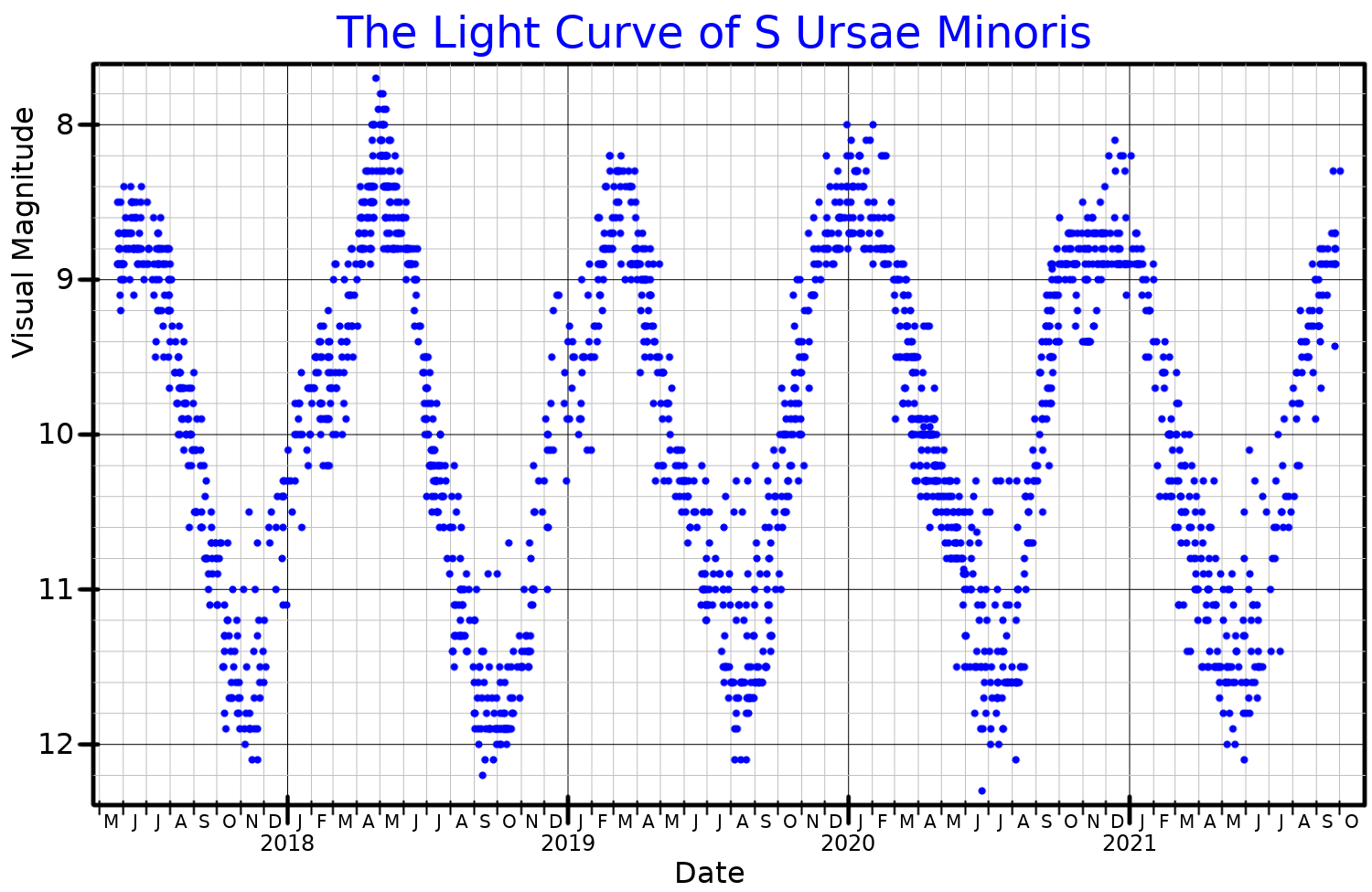
- The visual band light curve of S Ursae Minoris, from AAVSO data

Observation data Epoch J2000 Equinox ICRS
- Constellation: Ursa Minor
- Right ascension: 15^{h} 29^{m} 34.5775^{s}
- Declination: +78° 38′ 00.274″
- Apparent magnitude (V): 7.5-<13.2

Characteristics
- Evolutionary stage: AGB
- Spectral type: M6e-M9e
- Variable type: Mira

Astrometry
Proper motion (μ)	RA: −30.986±0.303 mas/yr Dec.: 7.006±0.309 mas/yr
Parallax (π)	2.5455±0.1578 mas
Distance	1,280 ± 80 ly (390 ± 20 pc)

Details
Mass	2.3 M_{☉}
Radius	744 R_{☉}
Luminosity	3,896 L_{☉}
Surface gravity (log g)	1.63 cgs
Temperature	3,457 K

Other designations
- S UMi, HD 139492, HIP 75847

Database references
SIMBAD	data

S Ursae Minoris (S UMi) is a Mira variable star in the constellation Ursa Minor, ranging from magnitude 7.5 to fainter than 13.2 over a period of 331 days.

Williamina Fleming discovered that the star's brightness varies, in 1895.
