= Polaris Flare =

Molecular cloud in the constellation Ursa Minor

Molecular cloud
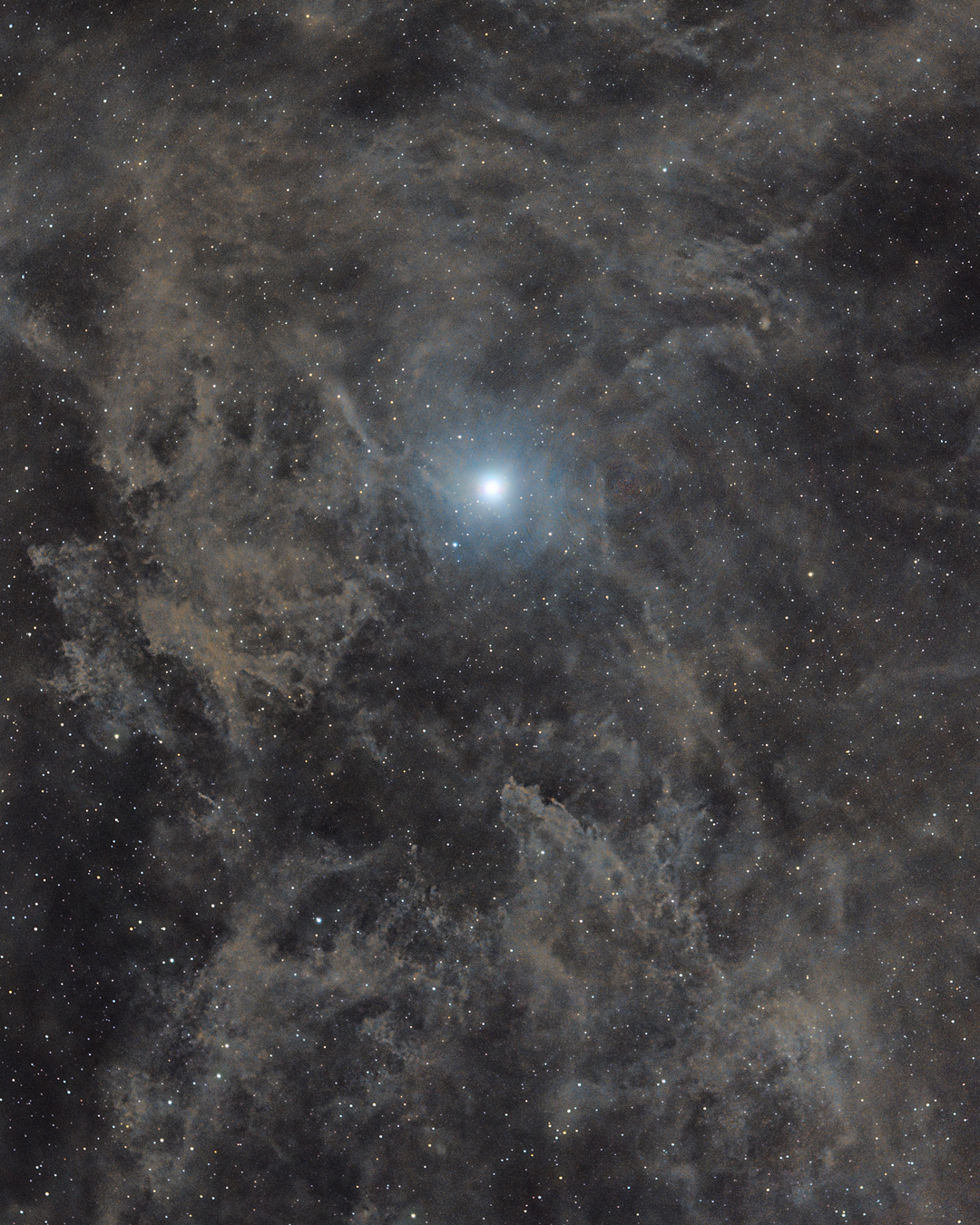

Observation data: J2000.0 epoch
- Right ascension: 11^{h} 00^{m} 14.8^{s}
- Declination: +86° 10′ 52″
- Distance: 500 ly
- Apparent dimensions (V): 360′
- Constellation: Ursa Minor
- Designations: DT16

The Polaris Flare is a filamentous gas cloud in the Milky Way which is seen in the sky in the region of the constellation Ursa Minor and around the star Polaris. The area on the sky is estimated at 50 square degrees. The range is approximately 500 light years.

== See also ==
- List of molecules in interstellar space
- Interplanetary medium – interplanetary dust
- Interstellar medium – interstellar dust
- Intergalactic medium – Intergalactic dust
- Local Interstellar Cloud
