= W Ursae Minoris =

Multiple star system in the constellation Ursa Minor

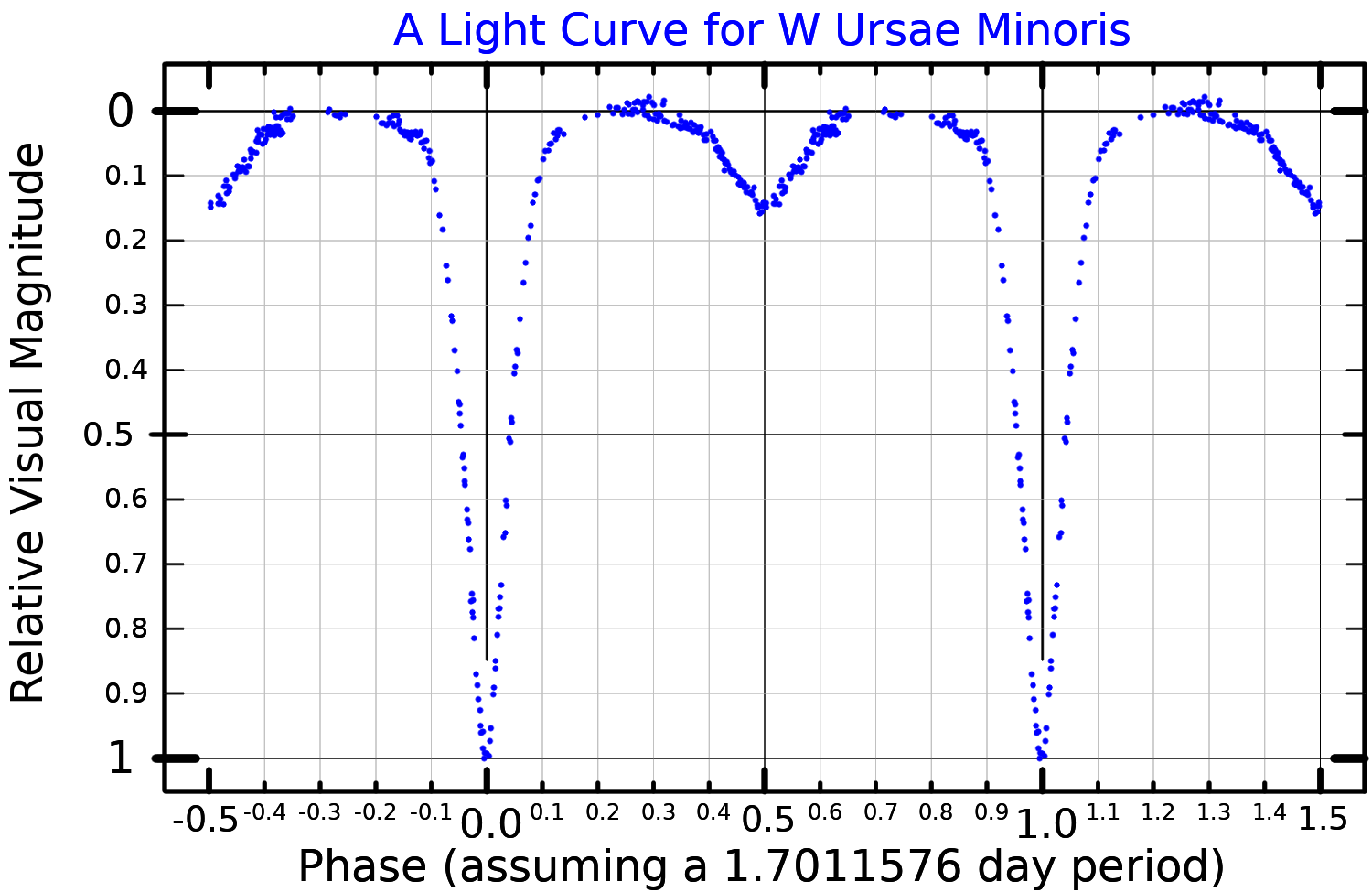
- A visual band light curve for W Ursae Minoris, adapted from Devinney et al. (1970)

Observation data Epoch J2000 Equinox ICRS
- Constellation: Ursa Minor
- Right ascension: 16^{h} 08^{m} 27.2728^{s}
- Declination: +86° 11′ 59.551″
- Apparent magnitude (V): 8.51-9.59

Characteristics
- Spectral type: A1/2V (A3V + G2IV)
- Variable type: Algol

Astrometry
Radial velocity (R_{v})	−15.3±1.1 km/s
Proper motion (μ)	RA: −12.128±0.057 mas/yr Dec.: 15.934±0.058 mas/yr
Parallax (π)	2.4144±0.0315 mas
Distance	1,350 ± 20 ly (414 ± 5 pc)

Orbit
Period (P)	1.7 days
Semi-major axis (a)	10.01±0.06 R_{☉}
Eccentricity (e)	0
Inclination (i)	83.57±0.18°
Semi-amplitude (K_{1}) (primary)	90.4±1.5 km/s
Semi-amplitude (K_{2}) (secondary)	196.6±2.6 km/s

Details

Aa
Mass	3.22±0.08 M_{☉}
Radius	9.63±0.04 R_{☉}
Luminosity	89±6 L_{☉}
Surface gravity (log g)	3.83±0.02 cgs
Temperature	9,310±90 K

Ab
Mass	1.44±0.05 M_{☉}
Radius	3.09±0.03 R_{☉}
Luminosity	6.5+1.3 −1.1 L_{☉}
Surface gravity (log g)	3.62±0.02 cgs
Temperature	5,240±200 K
Age	≈400 Myr

Other designations
- HD 150265, HIP 79069, SAO 2692

Database references
SIMBAD	data

W Ursae Minoris is an eclipsing binary star system in the constellation Ursa Minor. Its apparent magnitude ranges from 8.51 to 9.59 over 1.7 days as one star passes in front of the other relative to observers on Earth. The combined spectrum of the system is A1/2V.

Thomas Astbury discovered that this star's brightness varies, on April 7, 1913. Slight changes in the orbital period suggest that there is a third component of the multiple star system, most likely a red dwarf, with an orbital period of 62.2±3.9 years. Another study suggests that the third star has a minimum mass of 0.49 M_{☉} and an orbit of about 72 years.

The two main stars are currently thought to have masses of 3.2 M_{☉} and 1.4 M_{☉} respectively. Models of their evolution and mass transfer suggest that the secondary star was initially the more massive of the two and that it has lost mass to what is now the primary as well as losing mass completely from the system. The two stars have also spiralled in towards each other over the few hundred million years since they formed.
