= RW Ursae Minoris =

Nova that appeared in 1956

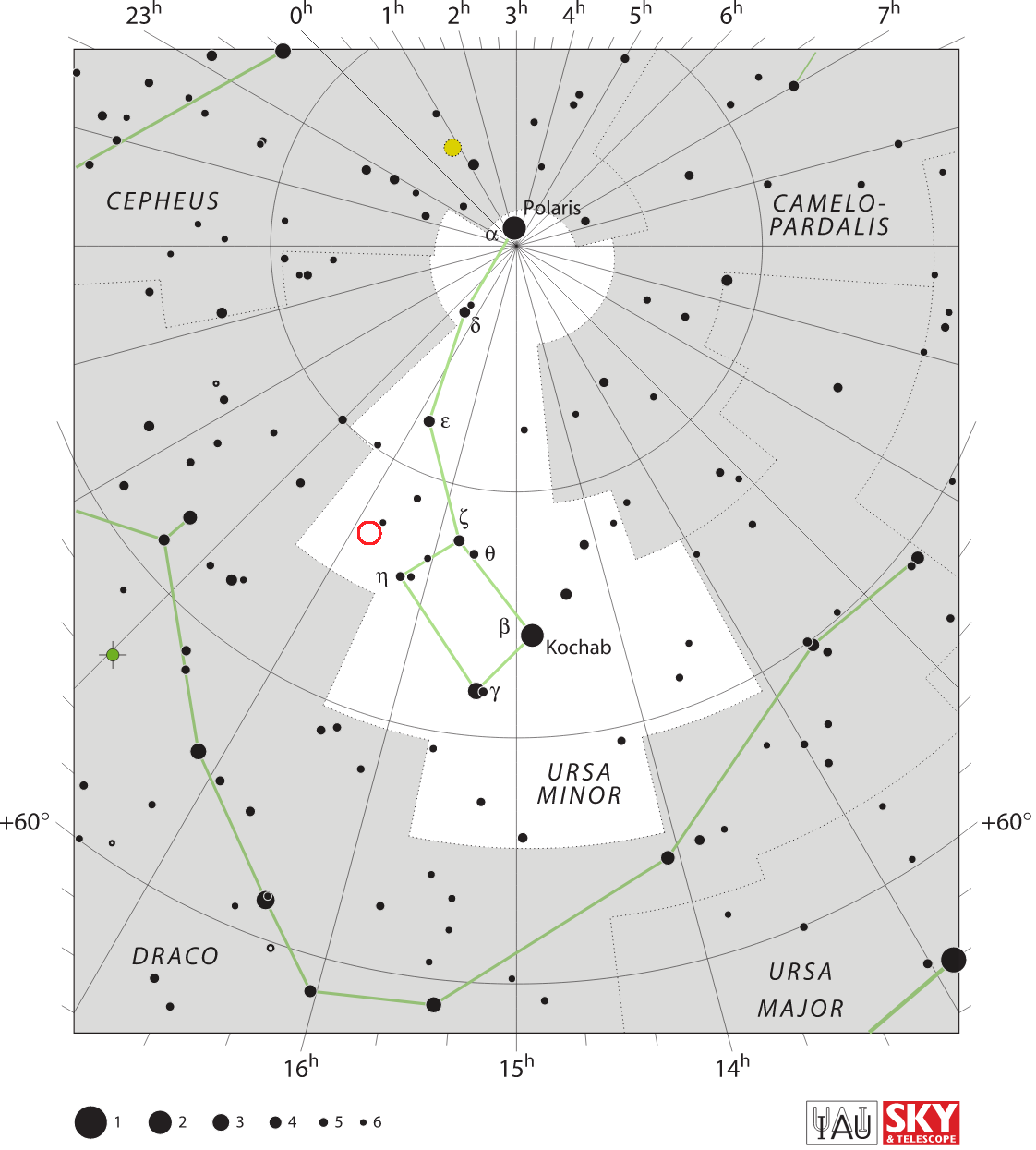
- Location of RW Ursae Minoris (circled in red)

Observation data Epoch J2000 Equinox J2000
- Constellation: Ursa Minor
- Right ascension: 16^{h} 47^{m} 54.8186^{s}
- Declination: +77° 02′ 12.047″
- Apparent magnitude (V): 6 Max. >21 Min.

Astrometry
Proper motion (μ)	RA: −0.574 mas/yr Dec.: −1.940 mas/yr
Parallax (π)	0.4296±0.1644 mas
Distance	2,558+2,138 −767 pc

Characteristics
- Variable type: classical nova

Other designations
- AAVSO 1651+77, Nova UMi 1956, Gaia DR2 1704994848488583552

Database references
SIMBAD	data

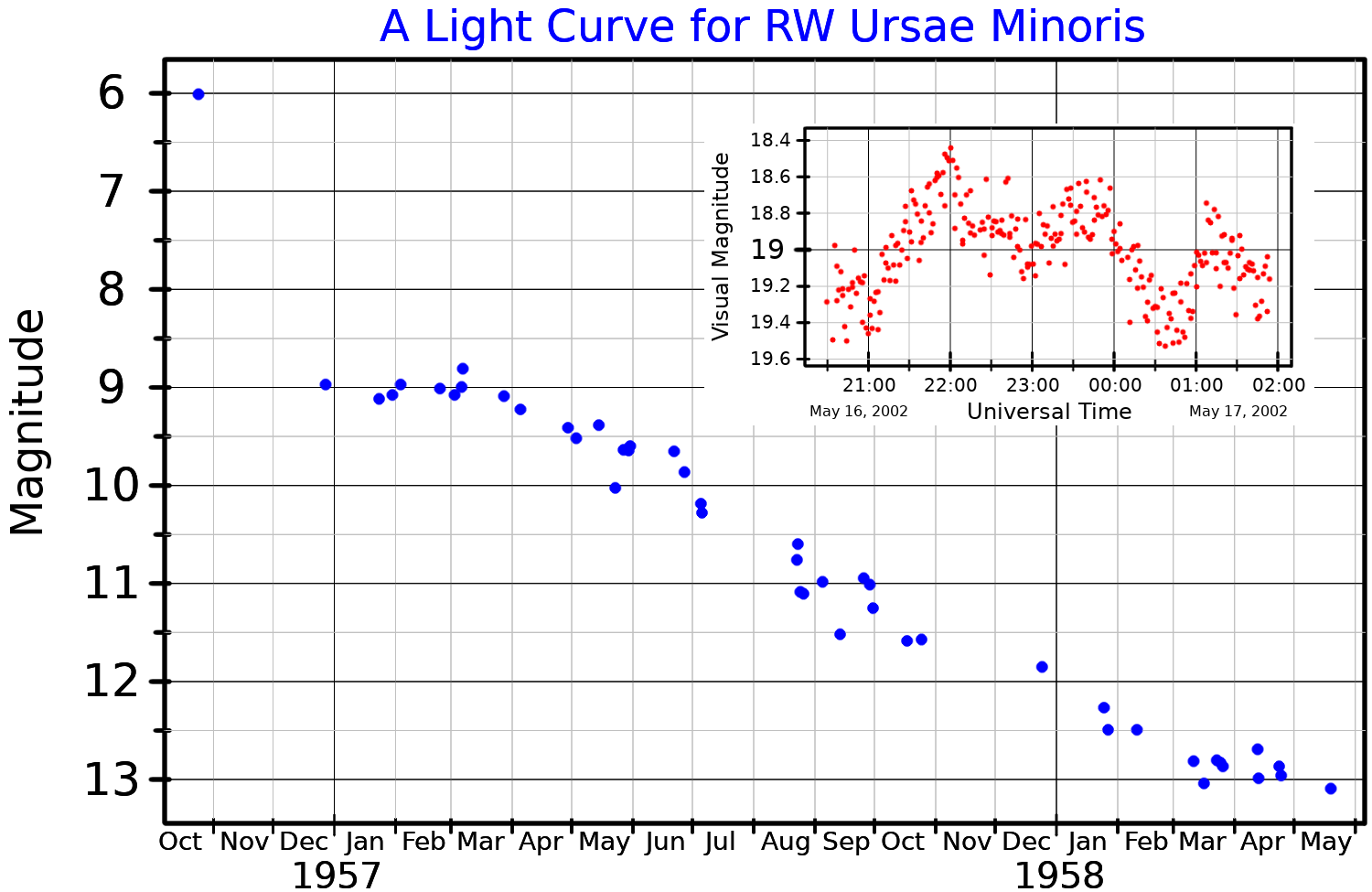
A light curve for RW Ursae Minoris, adapted from Ahnert (1963) and Bianchini et al. (2003)

RW Ursae Minoris (Nova Ursae Minoris 1956) is a cataclysmic variable star system that flared up as a nova in the constellation Ursa Minor in 1956.

Although the nova eruption of RW UMi occurred in 1956, it was not noticed until nearly six years later when, in 1962, V. Satyvaldiev found it on sky-patrol plates of the Astrophysical Institute of the Tajik Academy of Sciences in Dushanbe. On 24 September 1956 it had an apparent magnitude of 6. It may have been as bright as magnitude 3.5 around 19 September 1956, which would have made it easily visible to the naked eye, but the full moon on 20 September 1956 would have hampered observations around that date. RW Ursae Minoris's pre-nova brightness was about magnitude 21, but early in the 21st century it was still two magnitudes brighter than that.

Novae tend to be found near the galactic plane, but RW Ursae Minoris has a galactic latitude of 33 degrees, which is far from the plane of the Milky Way. Because of this, and its large outburst amplitude, astronomers were initially unsure about whether RW Ursae Minoris was a nova in the Milky Way or a supernova in another galaxy. It was eventually identified as a nova in the galactic halo on the basis of its light curve and spectrum.

All novae are binary stars, with a "donor" star orbiting a white dwarf. The donor star is so close to the white dwarf that material from the donor is transferred to the white dwarf. In 1995 Retter and Lipkin detected a low amplitude (0.1 - 0.2 magnitude) variation in RW Ursae Minoris's brightness with a period of 1.4 hours. They argued that this 1.4 hour period is probably the orbital period of the binary pair, which would make it the shortest period orbit for any known nova.

RW Ursae Minoris is surrounded by a small nova remnant shell. In 1985, Judith Cohen reported its radius as 1 arc second based observations with the Hale Telescope. In 1995 Esenoglu et al. observed it with the Copernico 1.82 m telescope and measured a radius of ~1.5 arc seconds.
