= NGC 6251 =

Seyfert galaxy in the constellation Ursa Minor

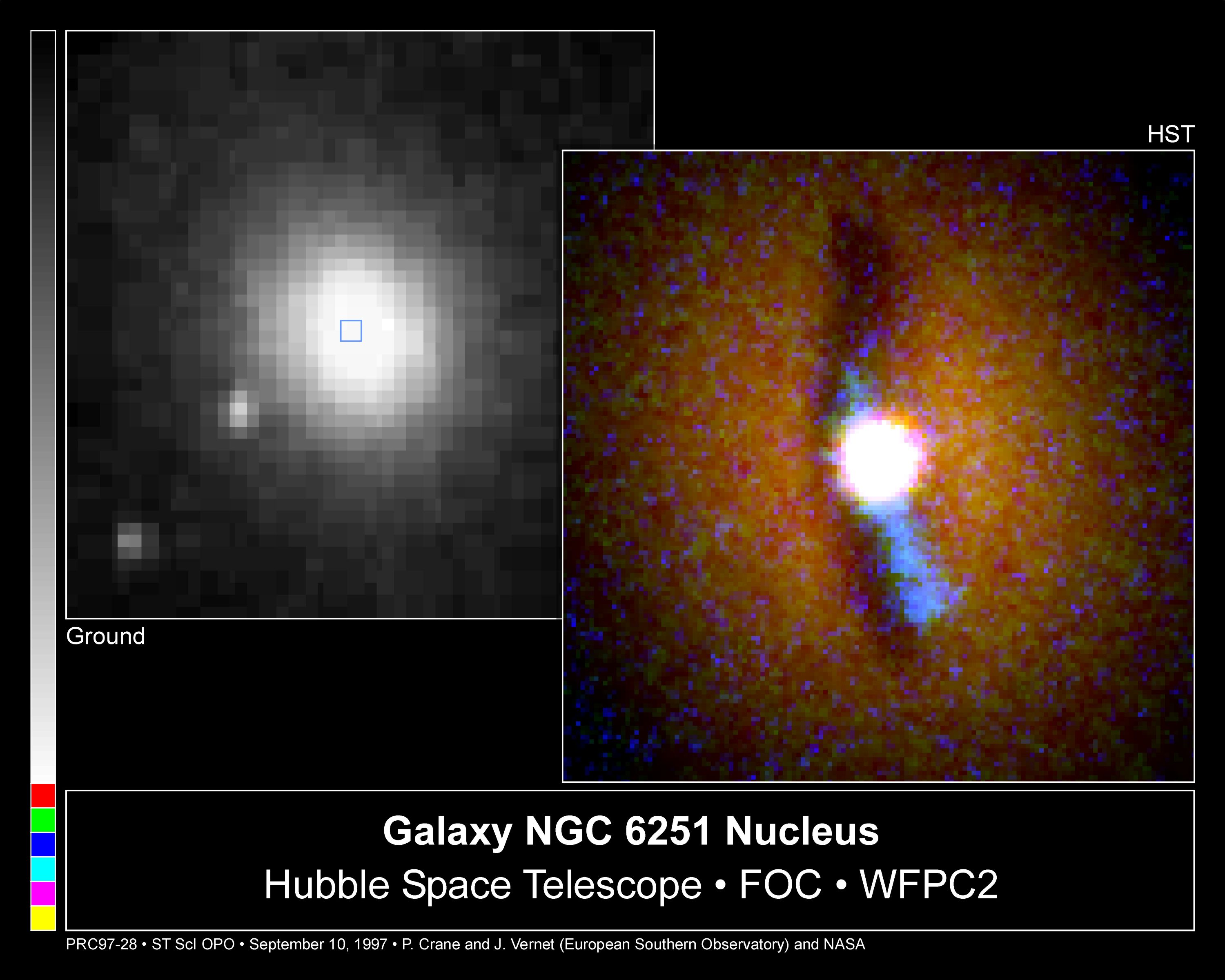
- Hubble image of the heart of the active galaxy NGC 6251

Observation data (J2000 epoch)
- Constellation: Ursa Minor
- Right ascension: 16^{h} 32^{m} 31.9700^{s}
- Declination: +82° 32′ 16.400″
- Redshift: 0.02471
- Distance: 340 million light-years
- Apparent magnitude (V): 14.3

Characteristics
- Type: E
- Apparent size (V): 1.82´X1.55´

Other designations
- NGC 6251, UGC 10501, LEDA 58472, 6C 1636+8239, QSO B1637+826

NGC 6251 is an active elliptical radio galaxy in the constellation Ursa Minor, and is more than 340 million light-years away from Earth. The galaxy has a Seyfert 2 active galactic nucleus, and is one of the most extreme examples of a Seyfert galaxy. This galaxy may be associated with gamma-ray source 3EG J1621+8203, which has high-energy gamma-ray emission. It is also noted for its one-sided radio jet—one of the brightest known—discovered in 1977. The supermassive black hole at the core has a mass of (5.9±2.0)×10^{8} M_{☉}.
