= R Ursae Minoris =

Star in the constellation Ursa Minor

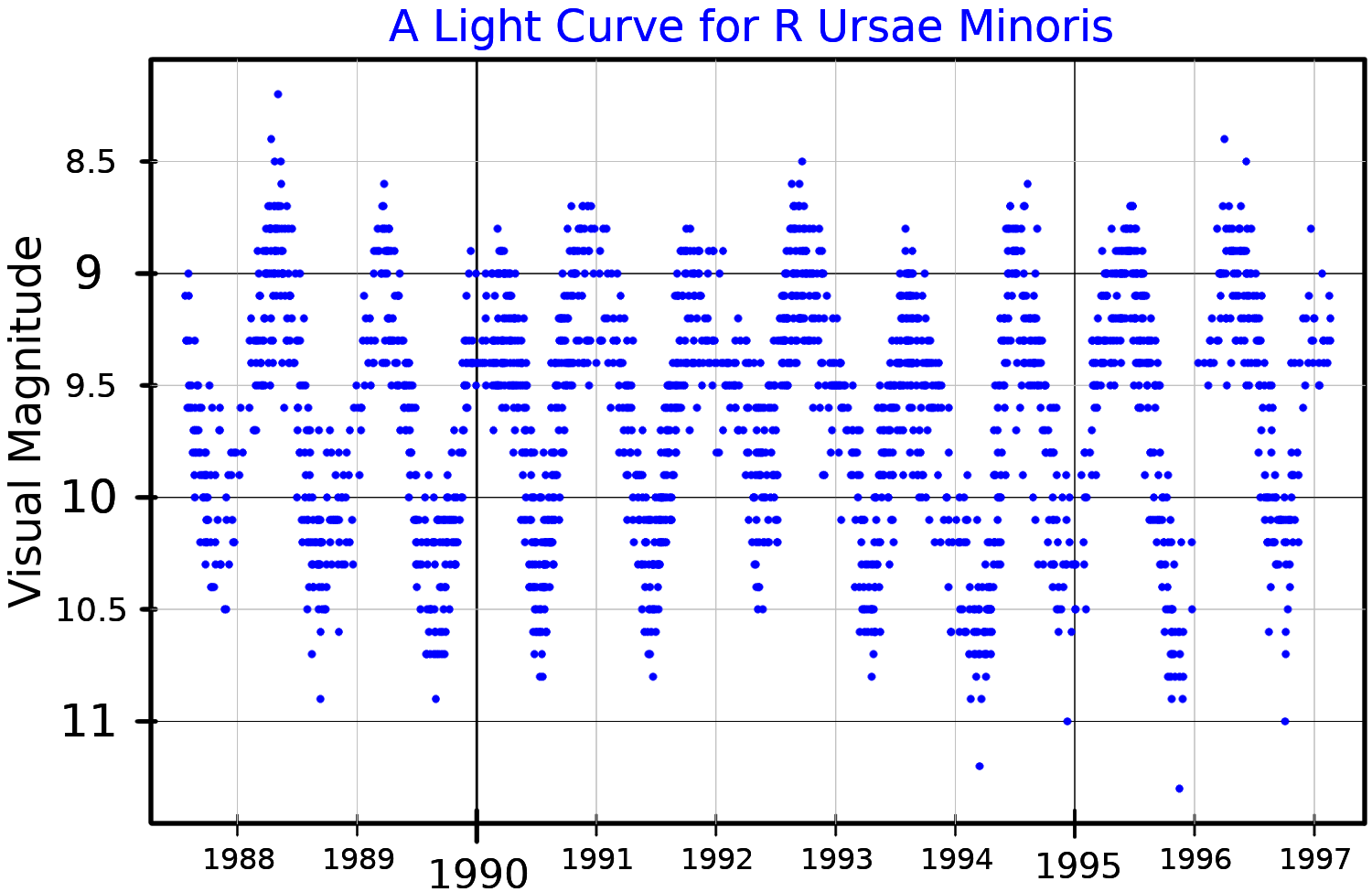
- A visual band light curve for R Ursae Minoris, plotted from AAVSO data

Observation data Epoch J2000 Equinox ICRS
- Constellation: Ursa Minor
- Right ascension: 16^{h} 29^{m} 57.8923^{s}
- Declination: +72° 16′ 49.166″
- Apparent magnitude (V): 8.5-11.5

Characteristics
- Evolutionary stage: AGB
- Spectral type: M7IIIe
- Variable type: semiregular variable

Astrometry
Proper motion (μ)	RA: 11.973±0.085 mas/yr Dec.: 13.976±0.092 mas/yr
Parallax (π)	2.6648±0.0629 mas
Distance	1,220 ± 30 ly (375 ± 9 pc)
Absolute magnitude (M_{V})	+2.461 (var)

Details
Mass	1.71 M_{☉}
Radius	686 R_{☉}
Surface gravity (log g)	−0.46 cgs
Temperature	2,875 K
Metallicity [Fe/H]	+0.07 dex

Other designations
- R UMi, BD+72°732a, HD 149683, HIP 80802

Database references
SIMBAD	data

R Ursae Minoris is a star in the constellation Ursa Minor. A red giant of spectral type M7IIIe, it is a semiregular variable ranging from magnitude 8.5 to 11.5 over a period of 325 days.

In 1881, Edward Charles Pickering announced that the star, at that time unnamed, is a variable star. It was listed with its variable star designation, R Ursae Minoris, in Annie Jump Cannon's 1907 work Second Catalog of Variable Stars.
