= RU Ursae Minoris =

Star in the constellation Ursa Minor

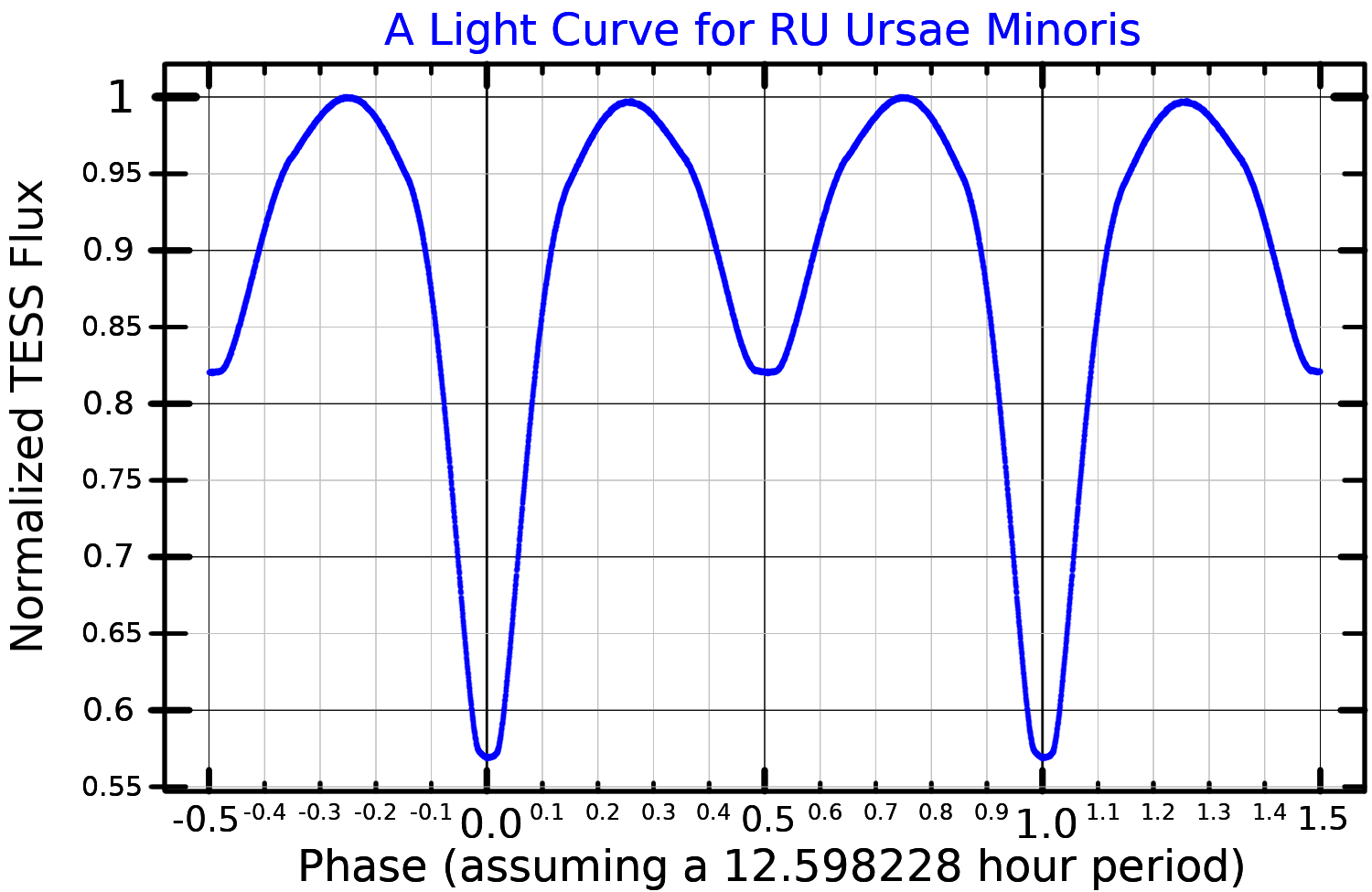
- A light curve for RU Ursae Minoris, plotted from TESS data

Observation data Epoch J2000 Equinox ICRS
- Constellation: Ursa Minor
- Right ascension: 13^{h} 38^{m} 56.8159^{s}
- Declination: +69° 48′ 11.1694″
- Apparent magnitude (V): 10 - 10.66

Characteristics
- Spectral type: F0 IV/V + K5V

Astrometry
Proper motion (μ)	RA: 17.253±0.056 mas/yr Dec.: −5.004±0.049 mas/yr
Parallax (π)	3.5007±0.0317 mas
Distance	932 ± 8 ly (286 ± 3 pc)
Absolute magnitude (M_{V})	2.45 ± 0.12 (A); 5.88 ± 0.19 (B)
Absolute bolometric magnitude (M_{bol})	2.48 ± 0.12 (A); 5.37 ± 0.19 (B)

Orbit
Period (P)	0.52492555(1) d
Semi-major axis (a)	3.99 ± 0.02 R_{☉}
Inclination (i)	82.33 ± 0.05°
Periastron epoch (T)	JD 2441596.33645(6)

Details

RU UMi A
Mass	2.32 ± 0.07 M_{☉}
Radius	1.78 ± 0.02 R_{☉}
Luminosity	7.63 ± 0.87 L_{☉}
Surface gravity (log g)	4.30 ± 0.02 cgs
Temperature	7200 ± 200 K

RU UMi B
Mass	0.76 ± 0.02 M_{☉}
Radius	1.14 ± 0.02 R_{☉}
Luminosity	0.54 ± 0.10 L_{☉}
Surface gravity (log g)	4.20 ± 0.02 cgs
Temperature	4630 ± 200 K

Other designations
- BD+70°751, TYC 4402-504-1, 2MASS J13385680+6948111, Gaia DR2 1686621699950649344

Database references
SIMBAD	data

RU Ursae Minoris is a binary star system in the constellation Ursa Minor. In 1960, Walter Strohmeier and Rüdiger Knigge announced their discovery that the star is a variable star. Its apparent magnitude ranges from 10 to 10.66 over 0.52 days as one star passes in front of the other relative to observers on Earth. Its component stars were calculated to be a primary star of spectral type F0IV/V and a secondary of spectral type K5V, both slightly more luminous than their spectral types indicate. The system is semidetached, as the secondary star is filling its Roche lobe and transferring matter to the primary. The primary is between 2.2 and 2.3 times as massive as the Sun, with 1.8 times its radius and around 8 times its luminosity. The secondary has around 0.72 times the Sun's mass, 1.1 times its radius and between 0.58 and 0.86 times its luminosity.

The period the two take to orbit each other is decreasing very slowly (by approximately 0.15 seconds per year), suggesting the components are moving closer and will become a contact binary.
