= Theta Ursae Minoris =

Suspected binary star in the constellation Ursa Minor

θ Ursae Minoris
- Location of θ Ursae Minoris (circled)

Observation data Epoch J2000 Equinox ICRS
- Constellation: Ursa Minor
- Right ascension: 15^{h} 31^{m} 25.05417^{s}
- Declination: +77° 20′ 57.6199″
- Apparent magnitude (V): 4.982

Characteristics
- Spectral type: K5-III CN0.5
- B−V color index: +1.553
- Variable type: suspected

Astrometry
Radial velocity (R_{v})	−25.3±0.5 km/s
Proper motion (μ)	RA: −47.55±0.37 mas/yr Dec.: +5.33±0.43 mas/yr
Parallax (π)	3.81±0.37 mas
Distance	860 ± 80 ly (260 ± 30 pc)
Absolute magnitude (M_{V})	−2.04

Details
Radius	96 R_{☉}
Luminosity	1,618 L_{☉}
Surface gravity (log g)	1.44±0.23 cgs
Temperature	3,962±36 K
Metallicity [Fe/H]	+0.18±0.06 dex

Other designations
- θ UMi, 15 Ursae Minoris, BD+77°592, FK5 3229, HD 139669, HIP 76008, HR 5826, SAO 8274

Database references
SIMBAD	data

Theta Ursae Minoris, Latinized from θ Ursae Minoris, is a suspected binary star system that is visible to the naked eye in the northern circumpolar constellation of Ursa Minor. It is roughly 860 light years from Earth with an apparent visual magnitude of 5.0. The system is moving closer to the Sun with a radial velocity of −25 km/s.

This is a probable spectroscopic binary, but the companion has not been detected directly. The spectrum matches a stellar classification of K5-III CN0.5, which would normally indicate an evolved, orange-hued giant star of type K that has a mild overabundance of cyanogen in the outer atmosphere. The estimated diameter is around 96 times that of the Sun, and it is radiating approximately 1,618 times the Sun's luminosity from an expanded photosphere at an effective temperature of 3,962 K.

Photometry from the Hipparcos satellite mission shows that θ Ursae Minoris varies in brightness by a few hundredths of a magnitude. It is listed as NSV 20342 in the New Catalogue of Suspected Variable Stars.
