= Epsilon Ursae Minoris =

Binary star system in the constellation Ursa Minor

- Location of ε Ursae Minoris (circled)

Observation data Epoch J2000.0 Equinox J2000.0 (ICRS)
- Constellation: Ursa Minor
- Right ascension: 16^{h} 45^{m} 58.24168^{s}
- Declination: +82° 02′ 14.1233″
- Apparent magnitude (V): +4.19

Characteristics
- Evolutionary stage: red-giant branch (A)
- Spectral type: G5 III + A8-F0 V
- U−B color index: +0.55
- B−V color index: +0.89
- Variable type: Eclipsing and RS CVn

Astrometry
Radial velocity (R_{v})	−10.57±0.40 km/s
Proper motion (μ)	RA: +19.47 mas/yr Dec.: +2.61 mas/yr
Parallax (π)	10.73±0.39 mas
Distance	300 ± 10 ly (93 ± 3 pc)
Absolute magnitude (M_{V})	−0.922

Orbit
Period (P)	39.48042±0.00012
Eccentricity (e)	0.04
Periastron epoch (T)	2433083.47 JD
Argument of periastron (ω) (secondary)	323.5°
Semi-amplitude (K_{1}) (primary)	31.8 km/s

Details

ε UMi A
Mass	3.50 M_{☉}
Surface gravity (log g)	2.48±0.10 cgs
Temperature	5,279±55 K
Metallicity [Fe/H]	+0.1±0.1 dex
Rotational velocity (v sin i)	25.6 km/s

Other designations
- ε UMi, 22 Ursae Minoris, BD+82°498, FK5 912, GC 22749, HD 153751, HIP 82080, HR 6322, SAO 2770, ADS 10242, CCDM 16460+8203

Database references
SIMBAD	data

Epsilon Ursae Minoris (ε Ursae Minoris) is a binary star system in the northern circumpolar constellation of Ursa Minor. It is visible to the naked eye with a combined apparent visual magnitude of 4.19. Based upon an annual parallax shift of 10.73 mas as seen from the Earth, it is located around 300 light years from the Sun. The pair are drawing nearer to the Sun with a radial velocity of −10.57 km/s.

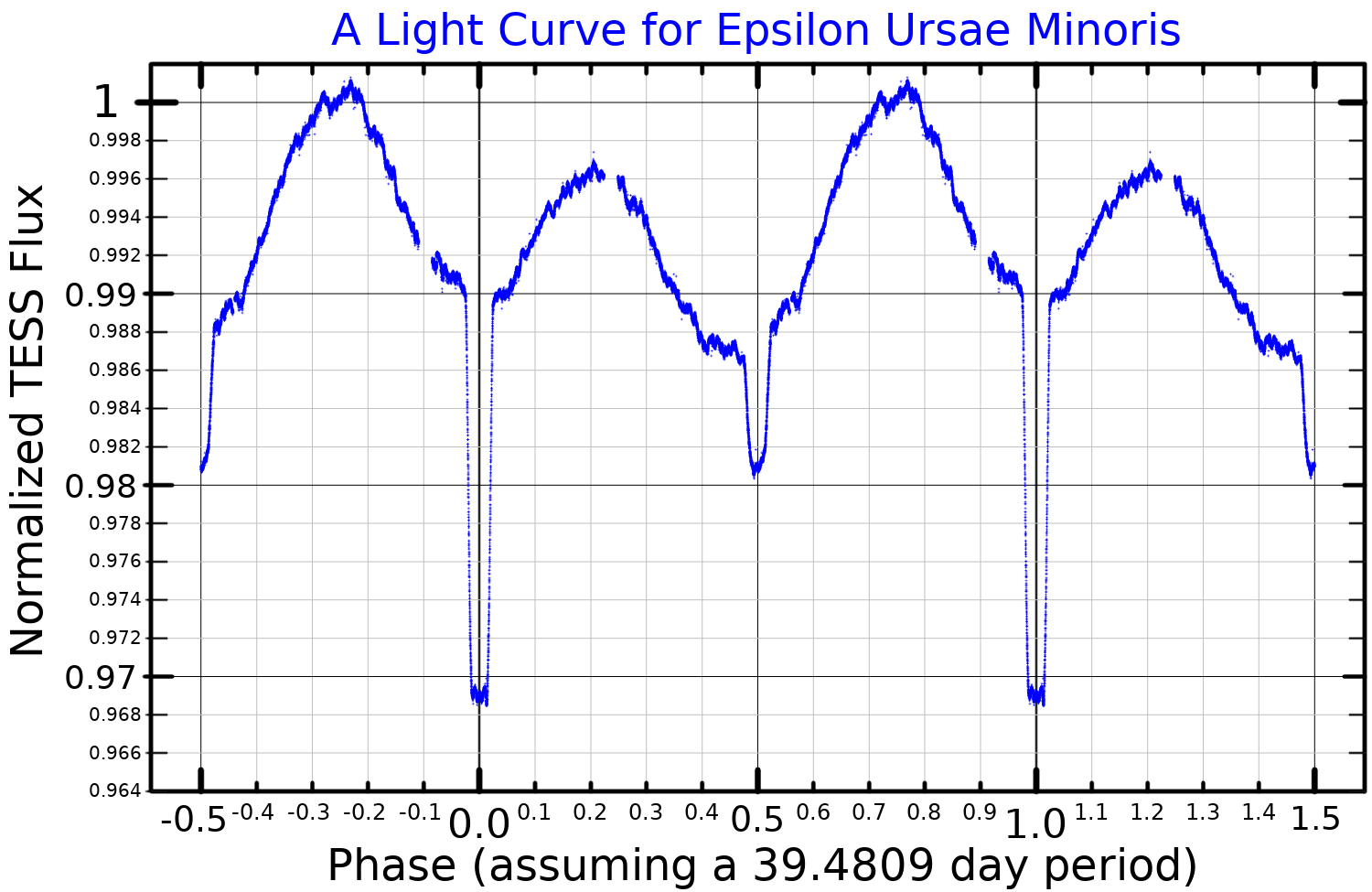
A light curve for Epsilon Ursae Minoris, plotted from TESS data

This system forms a detached, single-lined spectroscopic binary with an orbital period of 39.5 days and a low eccentricity of 0.04. Its binary nature was discovered in 1899 by American astronomer W. W. Campbell and the first orbital determination was made in 1910 by Canadian astronomer J. S. Plaskett. The orbital plane is nearly aligned with the line of sight to the Earth, so the pair forms an eclipsing binary. The primary eclipse has a minimum of 4.23 in magnitude, while the secondary minimum is magnitude 4.21. This eclipsing behavior was discovered by German astronomer P. Guthnick using observations between 1946 and 1947.

The primary is an evolved G-type giant star with a stellar classification of G5 III. The secondary is a main sequence star with a class in the range A8-F0 V. One of the pair is an active RS Canum Venaticorum type variable star, which is causing the net brightness to vary with a period that matches the orbital period of the binary. The primary has a high projected rotational velocity of 25.6 km/s, which is likely the result of synchronization effects from tidal interaction with the secondary.

Epsilon Ursae Minoris has a visual companion: a magnitude 12.32 star at an angular separation of 77.0 arc seconds along a position angle of 2°, as of 2014.

According to R. H. Allen's Star Names, the stars α, β, γ, δ & ε Ursae Minoris were collectively known as Circitores. This led to the name Circitores specifically for ε Ursae Minoris appearing in a 1971 NASA memorandum listing star names.
