= Zeta Ursae Minoris =

Star in the constellation Ursa Minor

ζ Ursae Minoris
- Location of ζ Ursae Minoris (circled)

Observation data Epoch J2000 Equinox ICRS
- Constellation: Ursa Minor
- Right ascension: 15^{h} 44^{m} 03.51892^{s}
- Declination: +77° 47′ 40.1788″
- Apparent magnitude (V): +4.29

Characteristics
- Spectral type: A3Vn
- U−B color index: +0.05
- B−V color index: 0.038±0.005
- Variable type: Suspected δ Sct

Astrometry
Radial velocity (R_{v})	−13.1±4.1 km/s
Proper motion (μ)	RA: 19.91 mas/yr Dec.: −1.99 mas/yr
Parallax (π)	8.84±0.12 mas
Distance	369 ± 5 ly (113 ± 2 pc)
Absolute magnitude (M_{V})	−0.98

Details
Mass	~3.4 M_{☉}
Radius	6.15 R_{☉}
Luminosity	227 L_{☉}
Temperature	8,720 K
Rotational velocity (v sin i)	210 km/s
Age	180 Myr

Other designations
- Zeta UMi, ζ UMi, 16 Ursae Minoris, NSV 7263, BD+78°527, FK5 590, GC 21243, HD 142105, HIP 77055, HR 5903, SAO 8328

Database references
SIMBAD	data

Zeta Ursae Minoris, which is Latinized from ζ Ursae Minoris, is a single star in the northern circumpolar constellation of Ursa Minor, forming the northernmost part of the bowl in this "little dipper" asterism. The star has a white hue and is faintly visible to the naked eye with an apparent visual magnitude of +4.28. It is located at a distance of approximately 369 light-years from the Sun based on parallax, but is drifting further closer with a radial velocity of about –13 km/s.

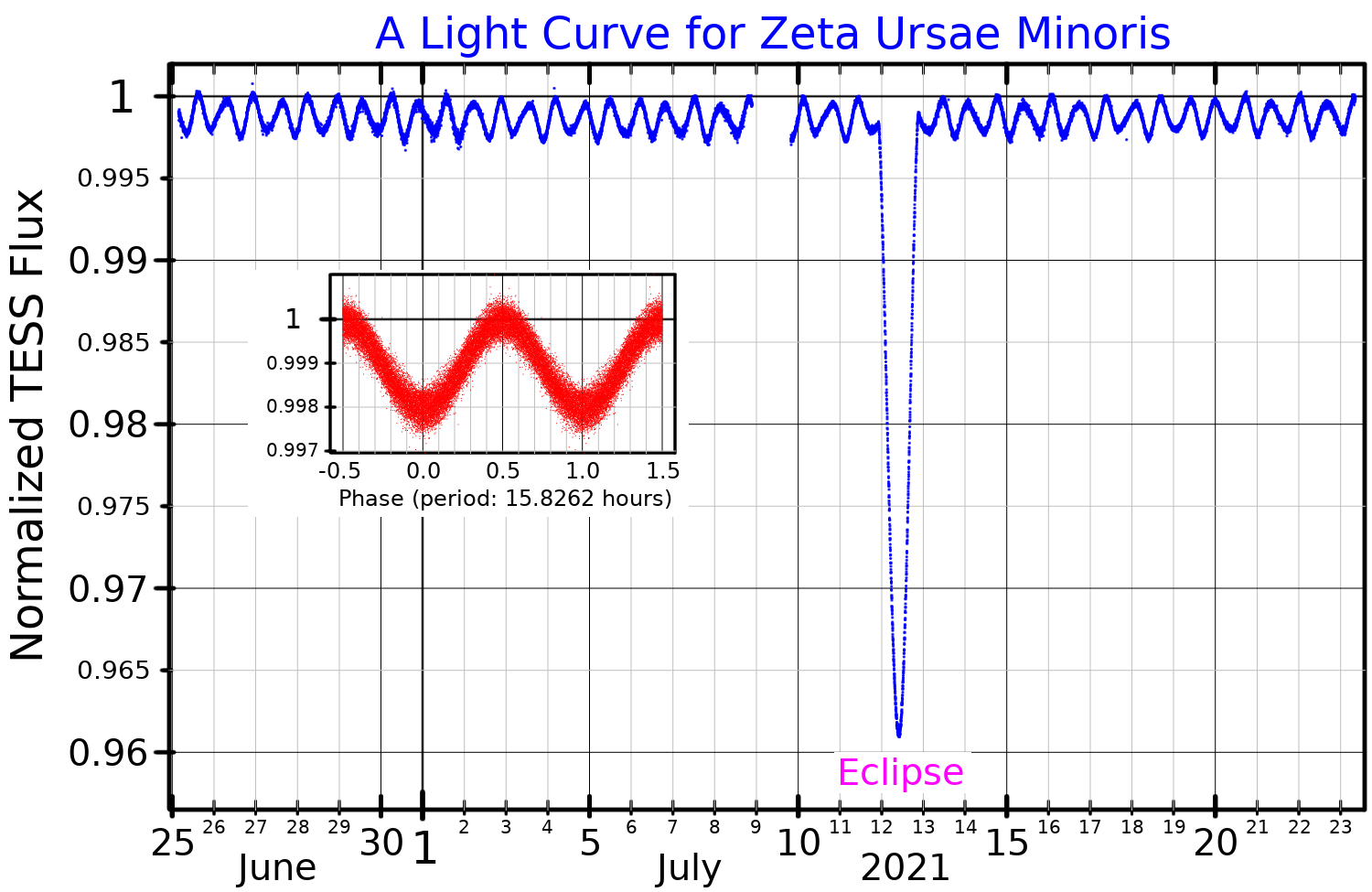
A light curve for Zeta Ursae Minoris, plotted from TESS data. The main plot shows the flux as a function of time, and the inset plot shows the same data (excluding the eclipse) folded with the pulsation period.

The stellar classification of Zeta UMi is A3Vn, a notation that indicates this is an A-type main-sequence star with broad "nebulous" absorption lines in its spectrum due to rapid rotation. Based on photometric data, some light variability was suspected by R. A. Baker in 1926, and it may be a Delta Scuti variable. It is a pulsating variable star, with a period of 15.8 hours, and it also undergoes eclipses. The star is spinning with a projected rotational velocity of 210 km/s, which is creating an equatorial bulge that is estimated to be 10% larger than the polar radius.

Zeta Ursae Minoris is about 180 million years old with 6.15 times the radius of the Sun. It is radiating 227 times the luminosity of the Sun from its photosphere at an effective temperature of 8,720 K. This anomalously high temperature and an absolute magnitude of –0.98 may indicate it is on the verge of evolving into a giant star. An infrared excess has been detected from an orbiting circumstellar disk. A black body fit to the data yields a mean dust temperature of 160 K and an orbital radius of 42.5 AU.

In some Arabic star charts it is listed as أخفى الفرقدين ʼakhfā al-farqadayn, meaning "the dimmer of the two calves", and paired with η Ursae Minoris as ʼanwar al-farqadayn, "the brighter of the two calves". The names may originally refer to a pair of Ibexes, and are more properly applied to γ UMi and β UMi, respectively, the brighter two stars in the rectangle of Ursa Minor.
