= Lambda Ursae Minoris =

AGB star in the constellation Ursa Minor

λ Ursae Minoris
- Location of λ Ursae Minoris (circled in red)

Observation data Epoch J2000.0 Equinox J2000.0
- Constellation: Ursa Minor
- Right ascension: 17^{h} 16^{m} 56.4107^{s}
- Declination: +89° 02′ 15.734″
- Apparent magnitude (V): +6.38

Characteristics
- Evolutionary stage: AGB
- Spectral type: M3+ IIIa
- U−B color index: +1.79
- B−V color index: +1.57
- Variable type: SRb

Astrometry
Radial velocity (R_{v})	+0.19 km/s
Proper motion (μ)	RA: −23.989 mas/yr Dec.: 3.463 mas/yr
Parallax (π)	3.7084±0.1329 mas
Distance	880 ± 30 ly (270 ± 10 pc)
Absolute magnitude (M_{V})	−0.85

Details
Radius	64 R_{☉}
Luminosity	741 L_{☉}
Temperature	3,772 K

Other designations
- HR 7394, HD 183030, BD+88°112, FK5 914, HIP 84535, SAO 3020

Database references
SIMBAD	data

Lambda Ursae Minoris (λ UMi, λ Ursae Minoris) is a star in the constellation Ursa Minor. It is an M-type red giant with an apparent magnitude of +6.38, making it very faintly visible to the naked eye under the best observing conditions. It is approximately 880 light years from Earth.

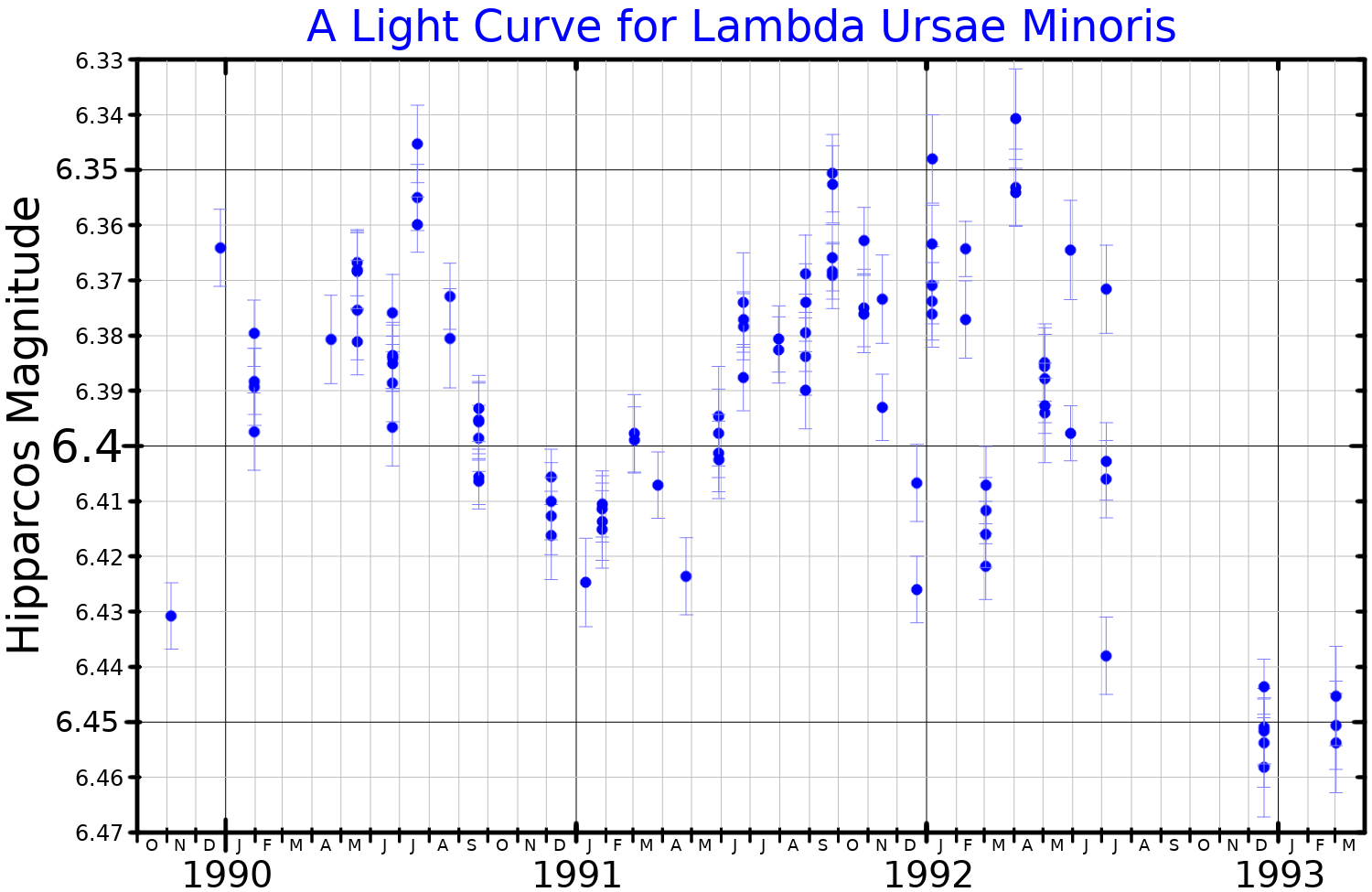
A light curve for Lambda Ursae Minoris, plotted from Hipparcos data

Lambda Ursae Minoris is an asymptotic giant branch (AGB) star, a star that has exhausted its core hydrogen and helium and is now fusing material in shells outside its core. AGB stars are often unstable and tend to pulsate, and Lambda Ursae Minoris is classified as a semiregular variable star and its brightness varies by about 0.1 magnitudes. Its variability was discovered by the Hipparcos satellite and it was entered into the General Catalogue of Variable Stars in 1999.

This star was used from 1882 as a reference to measure the magnitudes of stars in the northern hemisphere for the 1908 Revised Harvard Photometry catalogue. Sigma Octantis was used for the southern hemisphere. It was then noted that "Neither of these stars appears to vary perceptibly" but that, due to the procedures used "if they did, the variation would have no effect on the final measures."
