= RR Ursae Minoris =

Star in the constellation Ursa Minor

- Location of RR Ursae Minoris (circled in red)

Observation data Epoch J2000 Equinox ICRS
- Constellation: Ursa Minor
- Right ascension: 14^{h} 57^{m} 35.00959^{s}
- Declination: +65° 55′ 56.8146″
- Apparent magnitude (V): 4.44 - 4.85

Characteristics
- Evolutionary stage: AGB
- Spectral type: M5 III
- B−V color index: 1.590±0.017
- Variable type: SRb

Astrometry
Radial velocity (R_{v})	6.21±0.30 km/s
Proper motion (μ)	RA: −78.23 mas/yr Dec.: +32.5 mas/yr
Parallax (π)	7.1±0.37 mas
Distance	460 ± 20 ly (141 ± 7 pc)
Absolute magnitude (M_{V})	−1.11

Orbit
Period (P)	748.9 d
Eccentricity (e)	0.13±0.05
Inclination (i)	79.6±2.4°
Longitude of the node (Ω)	48.0±2.5°
Periastron epoch (T)	2,444,419±46 JD
Argument of periastron (ω) (secondary)	212±22°
Semi-amplitude (K_{1}) (primary)	8.3±0.3 km/s

Details
Mass	1.15±0.1 M_{☉}
Radius	113.93+5.4 −5.97 R_{☉}
Luminosity	1,583±172 L_{☉}
Surface gravity (log g)	0.00 cgs
Temperature	3,410±37 K

Other designations
- Tau Ursae Minoris (τ UMi), RR UMi, AAVSO 1456+66, BD+66°878, FK5 554, HD 132813, HIP 73199, HR 5589, SAO 16558

Database references
SIMBAD	data

RR Ursae Minoris, abbreviated RR UMi, is a binary star system in the northern circumpolar constellation of Ursa Minor. It can be viewed with the naked eye, typically having an apparent visual magnitude of around 4.710. Based upon an annual parallax shift of 7.1 mas as seen from Earth's orbit, it is located 460 light years away. The system is moving further from the Sun with a heliocentric radial velocity of +6 km/s.

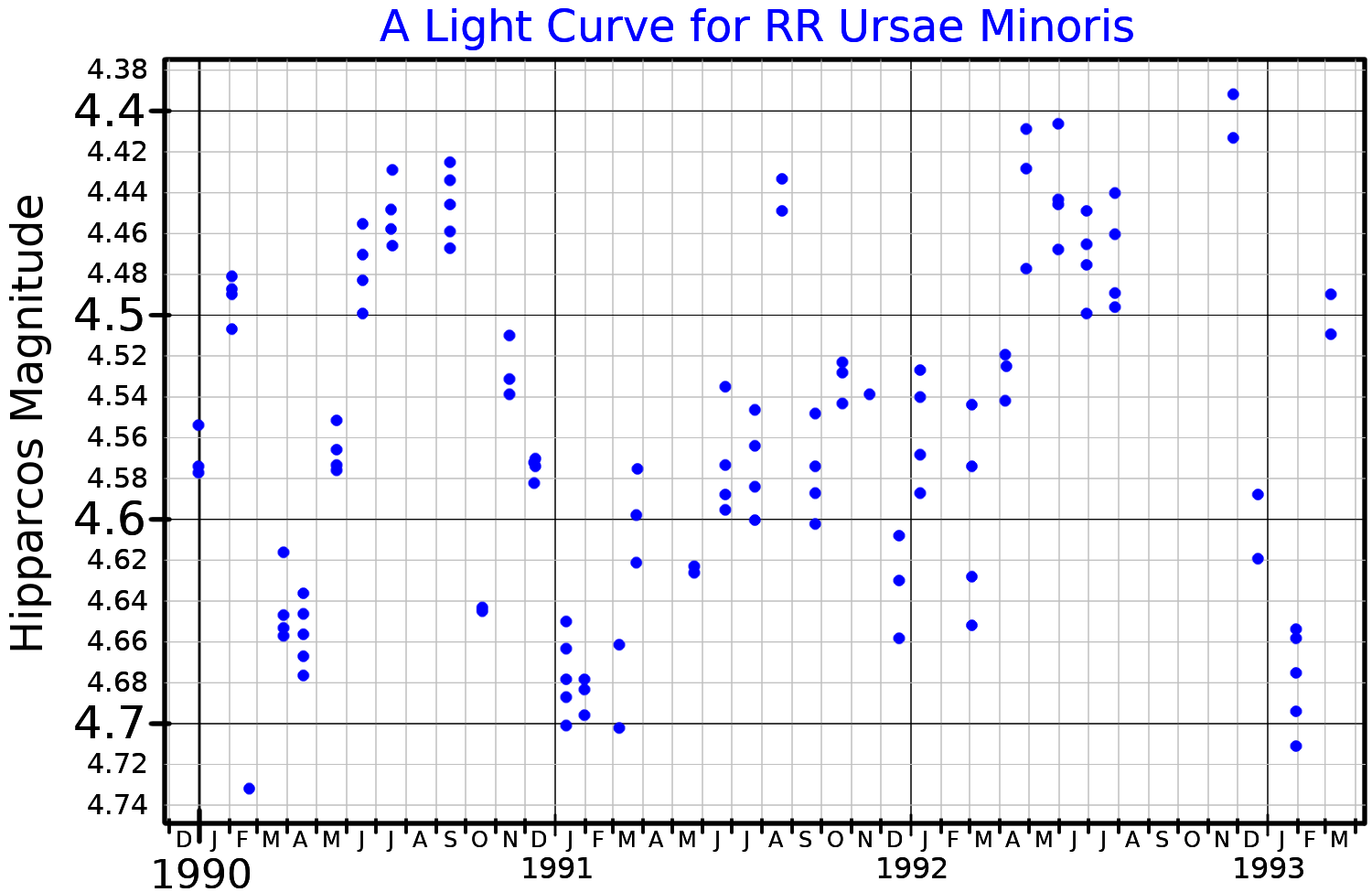
A light curve for RR Ursae Minoris, plotted from Hipparcos data

This star was found to have a variable radial velocity by J. H. Moore in 1910. It is a single-lined spectroscopic binary system with an orbital period of 2.05 years and an eccentricity (ovalness) of 0.13. The a sin i value is 84 Gm (0.56 AU), where a is the semimajor axis and i is the orbital inclination to the line of sight from the Earth. This gives a lower bound on the physical size of the orbit. The system is a source for X-ray and far-UV emission, with the latter most likely coming from the companion.

The visible component is an aging red giant star on the asymptotic giant branch with a stellar classification of M4.5 III. It was found to be a variable star by J. Ashbrook in 1946, and is catalogued as a semiregular variable of subtype SRb that ranges from magnitude 4.44 to 4.85 over a period of 43.3 days. However, variations in the period have been observed on a time scale of 30–60 days. The star has 1.15 times the mass of the Sun and has expanded to 110 times the Sun's radius. It is radiating 1,580 times the luminosity of the Sun from its enlarged photosphere at an effective temperature of 3,410 K.
