= Yildun =

Star in the constellation Ursa Minor

- Location of δ Ursae Minoris (circled)

Observation data Epoch J2000 Equinox J2000
- Constellation: Ursa Minor
- Right ascension: 17^{h} 32^{m} 12.99671^{s}
- Declination: +86° 35′ 11.2584″
- Apparent magnitude (V): 4.36

Characteristics
- Evolutionary stage: main sequence
- Spectral type: A1 Van
- U−B color index: +0.03
- B−V color index: +0.02

Astrometry
Radial velocity (R_{v})	−7.6±2.7 km/s
Proper motion (μ)	RA: +10.17 mas/yr Dec.: +53.97 mas/yr
Parallax (π)	18.95±0.14 mas
Distance	172 ± 1 ly (52.8 ± 0.4 pc)
Absolute magnitude (M_{V})	0.62

Details
Mass	2.35 M_{☉}
Radius	2.8 R_{☉}
Luminosity	47.77 L_{☉}
Surface gravity (log g)	4.04 cgs
Temperature	9,911±337 K
Rotation	19 hours
Rotational velocity (v sin i)	154 km/s
Age	327 Myr

Other designations
- Yildun, Vildiur, Gildun, δ UMi, 23 Ursae Minoris, BD+86°269, FK5 913, GC 24236, HD 166205, HIP 85822, HR 6789, SAO 2937

Database references
SIMBAD	data

Delta Ursae Minoris, Latinized from δ Ursae Minoris, formally named Yildun /jɪlˈdʌn/, is a white-hued star in the northern circumpolar constellation of Ursa Minor, forming the second star in the bear's tail. It is visible to the naked eye with an apparent visual magnitude of 4.36. Based upon an annual parallax shift of 18.95 mas as seen from Earth, it is located 172 light years from the Sun. The star is moving closer to the Sun with a radial velocity of about −8 km/s.

== Description ==
This is an A-type main-sequence star with a stellar classification of A1 Van, where the 'n' indicates "nebulous" absorption lines in the spectrum due to rapid rotation. It is spinning with a projected rotational velocity of 180 km/s, which is giving the star an oblate shape with an equatorial bulge that is an estimated 7% larger than the polar radius. The star is about 327 million years old with 2.35 times the mass of the Sun. It is radiating about 48 times the Sun's luminosity from its photosphere at an effective temperature of 9,911 K.

δ Ursae Minoris has a 12th magnitude common proper-motion companion at an angular separation of 4.5 arc seconds along a position angle of 67.3°, which is a projected separation of 237.4 au at the distance of δ Ursae Minoris. The pair were resolved using adaptive optics. The companion is assumed to be gravitationally bound and to have a mass of approximately 0.16 M_{☉}.

== Nomenclature ==
δ Ursae Minoris (Latinised to Delta Ursae Minoris) is the star's Bayer designation.

It bore the traditional name Yildun (also spelled Vildiur or Gildun) from the Turkish yıldız "star". In 2016, the International Astronomical Union organized a Working Group on Star Names (WGSN) to catalogue and standardize proper names for stars. The WGSN approved the name Yildun for this star on 21 August 2016 and it is now so entered in the IAU Catalog of Star Names.
