= Kochab =

Star in the constellation Ursa Minor

- Location of β Ursae Minoris (circled)

Observation data Epoch J2000 Equinox ICRS
- Constellation: Ursa Minor
- Right ascension: 14^{h} 50^{m} 42.32580^{s}
- Declination: +74° 09′ 19.8142″
- Apparent magnitude (V): 2.08

Characteristics
- Spectral type: K4 III
- U−B color index: +1.78
- B−V color index: +1.47

Astrometry
Radial velocity (R_{v})	+16.96 km/s
Proper motion (μ)	RA: −32.61 mas/yr Dec.: +11.42 mas/yr
Parallax (π)	24.91±0.12 mas
Distance	130.9 ± 0.6 ly (40.1 ± 0.2 pc)
Absolute magnitude (M_{V})	−0.83±0.010

Details
Mass	1.3±0.3 M_{☉}
Radius	44.13±0.22 R_{☉}
Luminosity	454±37 L_{☉}
Surface gravity (log g)	1.39±0.06 cgs
Temperature	4,008±37 K
Metallicity [Fe/H]	−0.27±0.07 dex
Rotation	625 – 6457 days
Rotational velocity (v sin i)	1.7±1.4 km/s
Age	2.95±1.03 Gyr

Other designations
- Kocab, Kochah, 7 Ursae Minoris, Al Kaukab al Shamaliyy, BD+74 595, FK5 550, HD 131873, HIP 72607, HR 5563, SAO 8102, PLX 3373.00

Database references
SIMBAD	Beta Ursae Minoris

Kochab /ˈkoʊkæb/, Bayer designation Beta Ursae Minoris (β Ursae Minoris, abbreviated β UMi, Beta UMi), is the brightest star in the bowl of the Little Dipper asterism (which is part of the constellation of Ursa Minor), and only slightly fainter than Polaris, the northern pole star and brightest star in Ursa Minor. Kochab is 16 degrees from Polaris and has an apparent visual magnitude of 2.08. The distance to this star from the Sun can be deduced from the parallax measurements made during the Hipparcos mission, yielding a value of 130.9 light-years (40.1 parsecs).

Amateur astronomers can use Kochab as a precise guide for equatorial mount alignment: The celestial north pole is located 38 arcminutes away from Polaris, very close to the line connecting Polaris with Kochab.

== Nomenclature ==
β Ursae Minoris (Latinised to Beta Ursae Minoris) is the star's Bayer designation.

It bore the traditional name Kochab, which appeared in the Renaissance and has an uncertain meaning. It may be from Arabic: الكوكب al-kawkab or Hebrew: כוכב kōkhāv, both of which are broadly used to describe a celestial body and can be translated as 'planet' or 'star'. (The Hebrew term was also applied to the planet Mercury, especially due to its lack of distinguishing features in comparison to other visible planets.) However, it is more likely derived from Alrucaba or Rucaba, a name applied to Theta Ursae Majoris. In 2016, the International Astronomical Union organized a Working Group on Star Names (IAU-WGSN) to catalog and standardize proper names for stars. The IAU-WGSN's first bulletin, July 2016, included a table of the first two batches of names approved by the IAU-WGSN, which included Kochab for this star.

In Chinese astronomy, 北極 Běi Jí ('North Pole') refers to an asterism consisting of Beta Ursae Minoris, Gamma Ursae Minoris, 5 Ursae Minoris, 4 Ursae Minoris and Σ 1694. Consequently, the Chinese name for Beta Ursae Minoris itself is 北極二 Běi Jí èr ('the Second Star of North Pole'), representing 帝 Dì ('emperor').

== Properties ==
This is a red giant star with a stellar classification of K4 III. Kochab has reached a state in its evolution where the outer envelope has expanded to 44 times the radius of the Sun. This enlarged atmosphere is radiating 540 times as much light from its outer atmosphere as the Sun, but through a surface more than 1,470 times larger than the Sun's surface area, hence at a lower effective temperature of 4,126 K. (The Sun's effective temperature is 5,772 K.) This relatively low heat gives the star the typical orange-hued glow of a K-type star. It is not known for certain if Kochab is on the red giant branch, fusing hydrogen into helium in a shell surrounding an inert helium core, or on the horizontal branch fusing helium into carbon.

By modelling this star based upon evolutionary tracks, its mass can be estimated as 1.4±0.2 M_{☉}. A mass estimate using the interferometrically-measured radius of this star and its spectroscopically-determined surface gravity yields 2.5 ± 0.9 M_{☉}. The star is known to undergo periodic variations in luminosity over roughly 4.6 days, with the astroseismic frequencies depending sensitively on the star's mass. From this, a much lower mass estimate of 1.3 ± 0.3 M_{☉} is reached.

== As the pole star ==
From around 2500 BCE, as Thuban became less and less aligned with the north celestial pole, Kochab became one "pillar" of the circumpolar stars, first with Mizar, a star in the middle of the handle of the Big Dipper (Ursa Major), and later with Pherkad (in Ursa Minor). Around the year 2467 BCE, the true north was well determined by drawing a plumb line between Mizar and Kochab, a fact with which the Ancient Egyptians were well acquainted. This cycle of the succession of pole stars occurs due to the precession of the equinoxes. Kochab and Mizar were referred to by Ancient Egyptian astronomers as 'The Indestructibles' lighting the North. As precession continued, by the year 1100 BCE, Kochab was within roughly 7° of the north celestial pole, with old references over-emphasizing this near pass by referring to Beta Ursae Minoris as "Polaris", relating it to the current pole star, Polaris, which is slightly brighter and will have a much closer alignment of less than 0.5° by 2100 CE.

This change in the identity of the pole stars is a result of Earth's axial precession. After 2000 BCE, Kochab and a new star, its neighbor Pherkad, were closer to the pole and together served as twin pole stars, circling the North Pole from around 1700 BCE until just after 300 CE. Neither star was as close to the north celestial pole as Polaris is now. Today, they are sometimes referred to as the "Guardians of the Pole".

Preceded by	Pole star	Succeeded by
Thuban	c. 1800 BC - 300 CE	Polaris

== Planetary system ==
Estimated to be around 2.95 billion years old, give or take 1 billion years, Kochab was announced to have a planetary companion around 6.1 times as massive as Jupiter with an orbit of 522 days.

The Kochab planetary system
Companion (in order from star)	Mass	Semimajor axis (AU)	Orbital period (days)	Eccentricity	Inclination (°)	Radius
b	≥6.1 ± 1.0 M_{J}	1.4 ± 0.1	522.3 ± 2.7	0.19 ± 0.02	—	—

Preceded by Thuban	Pole Star; 1900 BC–500 BC	Succeeded by Polaris
