= List of stars in Ursa Minor =

This is the list of notable stars in the constellation Ursa Minor, sorted by decreasing brightness.

Name	B	F	Var	HD	HIP	RA	Dec	vis. mag.	abs. mag.	Dist. (ly)	Sp. class	Notes
Polaris	α	1		8890	11767	02^{h} 31^{m} 47.08^{s}	+89° 15′ 50.9″	1.97	−3.64	431	F7:Ib-IIv SB	Pole Star, Lodestar, Alruccabah, Cynosura, Phoenice, Tramontana, Angel Stern, Navigatoria, Star of Arcady, Yilduz, Mismar, Polyarnaya, Dhruva; classical Cepheid, V_{max} = 1.97^{m}, V_{min} = 2.00^{m}, P = 3.9696 d
β UMi	β	7		131873	72607	14^{h} 50^{m} 42.40^{s}	+74° 09′ 19.7″	2.07	−0.87	126	K4IIIvar	Kochab, Kokab, Kochah; suspected variable, V_{max} = 2.02^{m}, V_{min} = 2.08^{m}, has a planet (b)
γ UMi	γ	13		137422	75097	15^{h} 20^{m} 43.75^{s}	+71° 50′ 02.3″	3.04	−2.84	480	A3II-III	Pherkad, Pherkad Major; δ Sct variable, ΔV = 0.05^{m}, P = 0.143009 d
ε UMi	ε	22		153751	82080	16^{h} 45^{m} 58.16^{s}	+82° 02′ 14.1″	4.21	−0.92	346	G5IIIvar	RS CVn variable, V_{max} = 4.19^{m}, V_{min} = 4.23^{m}, P = 39.4809 d
5 UMi	a	5		127700	70692	14^{h} 27^{m} 31.52^{s}	+75° 41′ 45.4″	4.25	−0.87	345	K4III	
ζ UMi	ζ	16		142105	77055	15^{h} 44^{m} 03.46^{s}	+77° 47′ 40.2″	4.29	−1.02	376	A3Vn	Ahfa al Farkadain
δ UMi	δ	23		166205	85822	17^{h} 32^{m} 12.90^{s}	+86° 35′ 10.8″	4.35	0.61	183	A1Vn	Yildun, Gildun, Vildiur, Yilduz, Pherkard
RR UMi	τ		RR	132813	73199	14^{h} 57^{m} 35.12^{s}	+65° 55′ 56.6″	4.63	−0.80	398	M5III	semiregular variable, V_{max} = 4.44^{m}, V_{min} = 4.85^{m}, P = 43.3 d
4 UMi	b	4		124547	69112	14^{h} 08^{m} 51.01^{s}	+77° 32′ 50.8″	4.80	−1.13	500	K3III	
η UMi	η	21		148048	79822	16^{h} 17^{m} 30.50^{s}	+75° 45′ 16.9″	4.95	2.58	97	F5V	Anwar al Farkadain, Alasco
θ UMi	θ	15		139669	76008	15^{h} 31^{m} 25.05^{s}	+77° 20′ 57.6″	5.00	−2.03	832	K5III	suspected variable
11 UMi	ι	11		136726	74793	15^{h} 17^{m} 05.88^{s}	+71° 49′ 26.0″	5.02	−0.37	389	K4III	Pherkad Minor; has a planet (b)
HD 136064	ν			136064	74605	15^{h} 14^{m} 38.00^{s}	+67° 20′ 51.6″	5.15	3.13	83	F9IV	
HD 124730	ξ			124730	69373	14^{h} 12^{m} 04.05^{s}	+69° 25′ 57.6″	5.18	−0.50	445	M2III	variable star, ΔV = 0.010^{m}, P = 4.43184 d
19 UMi	κ	19		146926	79280	16^{h} 10^{m} 49.53^{s}	+75° 52′ 39.1″	5.48	−1.07	665	B8V	
HD 118904	σ			118904	66435	13^{h} 37^{m} 11.05^{s}	+71° 14′ 32.2″	5.50	0.05	400	K2III	has a planet (b)
HD 149681				149681	80480	16^{h} 25^{m} 43.53^{s}	+78° 57′ 49.0″	5.55	2.42	138	F0V	
HD 133002				133002	72573	14^{h} 50^{m} 19.63^{s}	+82° 30′ 45.0″	5.63	2.45	141	F9V	
HD 140227				140227	76519	15^{h} 37^{m} 39.21^{s}	+69° 16′ 59.6″	5.65	−1.51	881	M0III	
HD 145622				145622	78661	16^{h} 03^{m} 31.40^{s}	+76° 47′ 38.0″	5.73	−0.53	581	A3V	
HD 158996				158996	84769	17^{h} 19^{m} 37.05^{s}	+80° 08′ 11.0″	5.74	−1.67	991	K5III	has a planet (b)
24 UMi		24		166926	85699	17^{h} 30^{m} 46.97^{s}	+86° 58′ 04.9″	5.78	2.38	156	A2m	
HD 117187				117187	65536	13^{h} 26^{m} 08.02^{s}	+72° 23′ 29.4″	5.82	−1.63	1009	M1III	
HD 120084				120084	66903	13^{h} 42^{m} 39.38^{s}	+78° 03′ 51.6″	5.91	0.96	318	G7III:	has a planet (b)
HD 152303				152303	81854	16^{h} 43^{m} 06.14^{s}	+77° 30′ 48.5″	5.99	3.21	117	F4V	
HD 147321				147321	79601	16^{h} 14^{m} 33.47^{s}	+73° 23′ 41.3″	6.02	−0.78	748	A3V	
VX UMi			VX	155154	83317	17^{h} 01^{m} 40.08^{s}	+75° 17′ 51.6″	6.17	2.91	146	F0IVn	γ Dor variable
HD 135384				135384	74272	15^{h} 10^{m} 44.40^{s}	+67° 46′ 51.8″	6.18	0.23	504	A8Vn	
HD 133994				133994	73706	15^{h} 03^{m} 57.73^{s}	+65° 55′ 11.0″	6.22	0.45	464	A2Vs	
UY UMi			UY	107192	59767	12^{h} 15^{m} 20.67^{s}	+87° 42′ 00.0″	6.27	2.93	152	F2V	γ Dor variable
HD 129245				129245	71196	14^{h} 33^{m} 38.62^{s}	+79° 39′ 36.8″	6.27	0.52	461	K3III	
λ UMi	λ			183030	84535	17^{h} 16^{m} 57.26^{s}	+89° 02′ 15.8″	6.31	−0.84	876	M1III	semiregular variable
HD 107113				107113	59879	12^{h} 16^{m} 49.35^{s}	+86° 26′ 09.0″	6.33	3.34	129	F4V	
HD 151623				151623	81428	16^{h} 37^{m} 52.81^{s}	+78° 55′ 06.8″	6.33	0.81	414	G9III	
HD 150275				150275	80850	16^{h} 30^{m} 39.08^{s}	+77° 26′ 45.1″	6.35	0.87	408	K1III	
20 UMi		20		147142	79420	16^{h} 12^{m} 32.20^{s}	+75° 12′ 38.1″	6.36	−0.49	765	K2IV	
HD 113889				113889	63822	13^{h} 04^{m} 49.78^{s}	+73° 01′ 29.8″	6.43	1.01	396	F0V	
3 UMi	μ	3		124063	68956	14^{h} 06^{m} 56.48^{s}	+74° 35′ 37.5″	6.43	0.79	438	A7V	
HD 5914				5914	7283	01^{h} 33^{m} 48.52^{s}	+89° 00′ 56.6″	6.46	1.49	321	A3V	
π^{1} UMi A	π^{1}			139777	75809	15^{h} 29^{m} 11.97^{s}	+80° 26′ 54.0″	6.57	4.85	72	G8IV-V+...	
9 UMi		9		133621	73440	15^{h} 00^{m} 27.71^{s}	+71° 45′ 54.9″	6.64	4.00	110	G0	
8 UMi		8		133086	73136	14^{h} 56^{m} 48.32^{s}	+74° 54′ 03.3″	6.83	0.95	489	K0	Baekdu; has a planet (b)
π^{2} UMi	π^{2}	18		141652	76695	15^{h} 39^{m} 38.72^{s}	+79° 58′ 59.2″	6.89	1.54	384	F2	
HD 150706				150706	80902	16^{h} 31^{m} 17.59^{s}	+79° 47′ 23.2″	7.03	4.85	89	G0	has an unconfirmed planet
U UMi			U	125556	69816	14^{h} 17^{m} 19.90^{s}	+66° 47′ 39.2″	7.10		858	M6-8e	Mira variable, V_{max} = 7.1^{m}, V_{min} = 13^{m}, P = 330.92 d
π^{1} UMi B	π^{1}			139813	75829	15^{h} 29^{m} 24.36^{s}	+80° 27′ 00.0″	7.30	5.62	71	G5	
14 UMi		14		137686	75152	15^{h} 21^{m} 30.52^{s}	+73° 28′ 35.1″	7.38	3.51	194	F5	
S UMi			S	139492	75847	15^{h} 29^{m} 34.57^{s}	+78° 38′ 00.3″	7.5		2450	M6.5-7.5e	Mira variable, V_{max} = 7.5^{m}, V_{min} = <13.2^{m}, P = 331 d
V UMi			V	119227	66562	13^{h} 38^{m} 41.07^{s}	+74° 18′ 36.3″	7.81		1280	M...	semiregular variable, V_{max} = 7.06^{m}, V_{min} = 8.7^{m}, P = 73 d
W UMi			W	150265	79069	16^{h} 08^{m} 27.28^{s}	+86° 11′ 59.6″	8.65		1600	A2V	Algol variable, V_{max} = 8.51^{m}, V_{min} = 9.59^{m}, P = 1.7011576 d
RU UMi			RU			13^{h} 38^{m} 56.81^{s}	+69° 48′ 11.2″	10.24			A2	β Lyr variable, V_{max} = 10^{m}, V_{min} = 10.66^{m}, P = 0.52492618 d
Z UMi			Z			15^{h} 02^{m} 01.48^{s}	+83° 03′ 48.7″	11.40			C	R CrB variable, V_{max} = 10.8^{m}, V_{min} = 19.0^{m}, P = 130 d
T UMi			T	118556		13^{h} 34^{m} 41.12^{s}	+73° 25′ 53.0″	11.46			M6e	Mira variable, V_{max} = 7.8^{m}, V_{min} = 15^{m}, P = 301 d
SS UMi			SS			15^{h} 51^{m} 22.34^{s}	+71° 45′ 11.9″	12.6			CV	SU UMa variable, V_{max} = 12.6^{m}, V_{min} = 17.6^{m}, P = 0.06778 d
WD 1337+705					66578	13^{h} 38^{m} 50.48^{s}	+70° 17′ 07.7″	12.77		85.14	DA2.4	white dwarf
H1504+65						15^{h} 02^{m} 09.62^{s}	+66° 12′ 18.6″	15.9			DZ...	possible pre-white-dwarf star
Calvera						14^{h} 12^{m} 56.0^{s}	+79° 22′ 04″			625		pulsar
RW UMi			RW			16^{h} 47^{m} 54.75^{s}	+77° 02′ 12.2″					DQ Her variable
WISE 1506+7027						15^{h} 06^{m} 49.89^{s}	+70° 27′ 36.2″			11.1	T6	brown dwarf
Table legend: • Name = Proper name • B = Bayer designation • F or/and G. = Flamsteed designation or Gould designation • Var = Variable-star designation • HD = Henry Draper Catalogue designation number • HIP = Hipparcos Catalogue designation number • RA = Right ascension for the Epoch/Equinox J2000.0 • Dec = Declination for the Epoch/Equinox J2000.0 • vis. mag. = visual magnitude (m or m_{v}), also known as apparent magnitude • abs. mag. = absolute magnitude (M_{v}) • Dist. (ly) = Distance in light-years from Earth • Sp. class = Spectral class of the star in the stellar classification system • Notes = Common name(s) or alternate name(s); comments; notable properties [for example: multiple star status, range of variability if it is a variable star, exoplanets, etc.]

== See also ==
- List of stars by constellation
