= Struve 1694 =

Binary star in the constellation Camelopardalis

Position of Σ 1694 (circled)

Struve 1694 (Σ 1694, Struve 1694) is a double star in the constellation Camelopardalis.

Σ 1694 is a double star, with components of magnitudes 5.3^{m} and 5.9^{m}:

- Σ 1694A (HD 112028) is a white A-type giant star with an apparent magnitude of 5.28^{m}. It is approximately 300 light years from Earth.
- Σ 1694B (HD 112014) is a spectroscopic binary consisting of two A-type main sequence stars.

Norton's Star Atlas describes the pair as yellowish and bluish.

In the British Association Catalogue, the star pair are listed as being in Ursa Minor.

== Chinese name ==
In Chinese, 北極 (Běi Jí), meaning North Pole, refers to an asterism consisting of Σ 1694, γ Ursae Minoris, β Ursae Minoris, 5 Ursae Minoris and 4 Ursae Minoris. Consequently, Σ 1694 itself is known as 北極五 (Běi Jí wǔ, English: the Fifth Star of North Pole), representing 天樞 (Tiānshū), meaning Celestial Pivot.

This star was regarded as the north star by the Chinese people from the Han dynasty to Song dynasty.
