= Wigan Grammar School =

Former school in Wigan, England (c.1597–1972)

- Wigan, Lancashire; England

Information
- Type: Grammar school
- Established: 1597
- Closed: 1972
- Gender: Male

Wigan Grammar School was an English grammar school in Wigan, Lancashire. The school originated in the late 16th century, with the earliest surviving records from 1597, though evidence suggests schooling in Wigan existed as early as 1208, and a schoolmaster was recorded in 1563. The school was formally built and endowed in 1613 by local benefactors. The school was once on Rodney Street and moved sites multiple times. The last schoolbuilding was constructed in 1935–37 and was opposite Mesnes Park, Wigan. The school eventually closed in 1972 during the shift to comprehensive education.

== History ==
The earliest surviving records of the school date from 1597. However, there is evidence of earlier education in the town. In 1208, a grant of land was made for a school, and a schoolmaster in Wigan is recorded in 1563. The grammar school was built and endowed in 1613 by Banks, Bullock, and Mollineauz, and some feoffees of the town. David Sinclair (1882) asserts that it had "formerly been styled the, Wigan College had resolved itself into the Wigan Free Grammar School", and that it certainly did not exist in 1536 (due to the Reformation) it was a scoliristic instittion "of no mean repute".

The Mayor of Wigan and the town corporation were responsible for the grammar school. In the early years of the grammar school, the town had no dedicated bookseller. The small number of books needed were stocked by the headmaster, and the profit from selling them formed part of his personal income. The first bookseller in Wigan was Edward Bigby, who in 1685 sought and received permission to begin operating in that trade. Henry Felden is the first recorded headmaster, who died in or prior to 1676.

The grammar school was founded to educate youth in Puritan tradition, emphasising religion, discipline, virtue and classical learning. Although it was a Free School, the number of free scholars was limited. The Mayor controlled the school, appointed the master, and enforced detailed regulations. The headmaster had to be a graduate or undergraduate of a Protestant university and proficient in Latin and Greek, and had to submit to an examination of his fitness before the Bishop of Chester. Students had long school hours, and the elder boys had to speak Latin during them. Students were allowed physical activities such as archery and running, but gambling and games like cards or dice were strictly forbidden and punished severely.

The statutes and rules of the grammar school were first written in 1664, with later additions in 1711 and 1720. They were displayed prominently in the old school in Rodney Street until teaching there ceased.

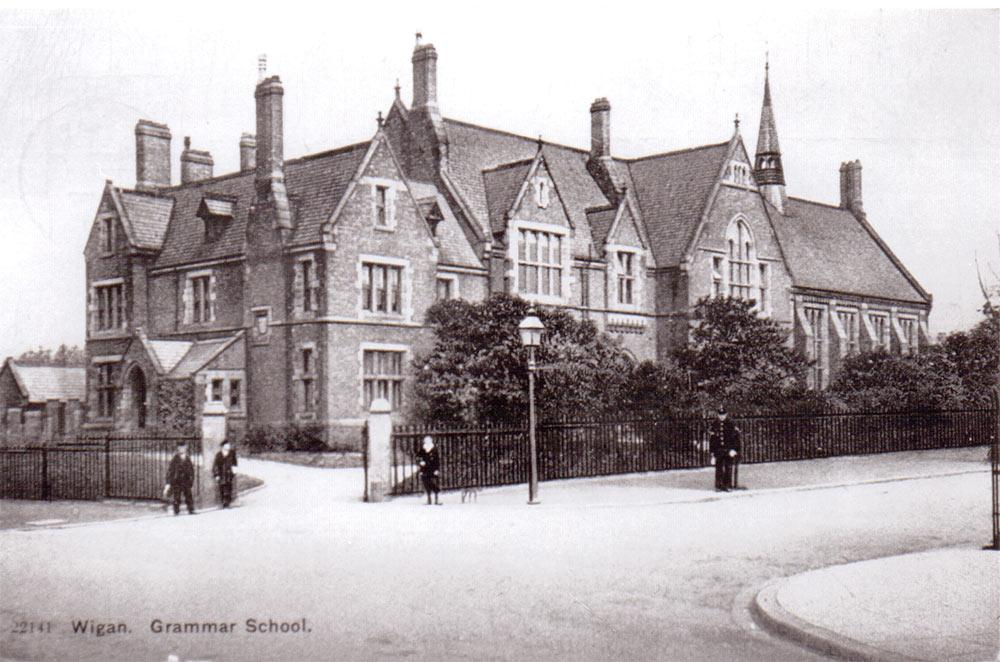
Wigan Grammar School in the early 1900s

Although the school was intended to benefit poorer children, fee-paying pupils gradually came to dominate, and rising costs effectively excluded the poor. The institution became largely controlled by wealthier families whose sons received inexpensive classical and commercial education. Public dissatisfaction eventually led to a petition in January 1838, signed by 683 residents, urging the mayor and council to end this monopoly and restore the school for the poor as originally intended.

In 1868, the curriculum was changed to include "all modern subjects, so as to enable boys to compete at the Oxford local examinations", and a preparatory school for boys under the age of 10 was established.

The third site of Wigan Grammar School was designed by Alfred Waterhouse, the architect of Manchester Town Hall and London's Natural History Museum. Built on the site of the now Linacre Centre on Parsons Walk, its construction was funded by charities. It was a large but limited building with a headmaster's house, a hall, and five classrooms. As student numbers grew, six temporary wooden huts were added on the playground. In 1923, control of the school passed to Wigan Corporation, and the building was demolished in the 1930s to make way for the current one.

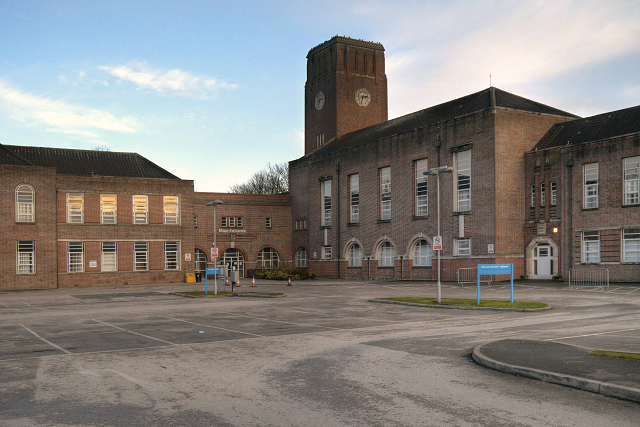
The former Wigan Grammar School built 1935–37

The school's final site was constructed in 1935–37. The building is in the Modernist style in brick with red tiles and pantile roofs. It is grade II listed building and was later part of Wigan College.

It closed in 1972 as part of the comprehensive education movement, and the building became Mesnes High School, which closed in 1989.

== Notable former pupils ==
- Ivor Abrahams, sculptor
- Stanley Alstead, Regius Professor of Materia Medica and Therapeutics from 1948-70 at the University of Glasgow
- Walter Anderson, general secretary from 1957-73 of NALGO
- James Anderton, former chief constable from 1976-91 of Greater Manchester Police (GMP)
- Colin Bean, actor in Dad's Army
- Eric Bolton, chairman from 1997-2000 of the BookTrust, Professor of Teacher Education from 1991-96 at the UCL Institute of Education
- Gordon Brown, chief engineer from 1958-62 of Windscale AGR, president from 1975-77 of the British Nuclear Energy Society (became the Nuclear Institute in 2009)
- Ernest Bullock, director from 1953-60 of the Royal College of Music (RCM), president from 1951-52 of the Royal College of Organists (RCO)
- Kenneth Bullock, Professor of Pharmacy from 1955-70 at the University of Manchester
- Gilbert Causey, Sir William Collins Professor of Anatomy from 1952-70 at the Royal College of Surgeons of England
- Noel Coulson, Professor of Oriental Laws from 1967-86 at the School of Oriental and African Studies
- David Gee, director from 1990-91 of Friends of the Earth, later at the European Environment Agency in Copenhagen
- William Gorman, Liberal MP from 1923-24 for Royton
- Walter Greaves-Lord, Conservative MP from 1922-35 for Norwood
- Thomas Halliwell, former Principal of Trinity University College (now part of University of Wales Trinity Saint David since 2010)
- John Heaton, chief executive from 1997-2004 of the Horserace Totalisator Board (The Tote)
- Brian Hill, chief executive from 1977-90 of Lancashire County Council
- Arthur John Hope, architect
- Paul Geoffrey Ince, Professor of Neuropathology at the University of Sheffield 2000-2018, president from 2016-2018 British Neuropathological Society, president from 2017-2020 European Confederation of Neuropathological Societies
- Stanley Jones, president from 1981-96 of the Printmakers Council, director from 1959-2012 of Curwen Studio
- Ian McKellen, actor (for one year until he was twelve)
- Ian Macleod, surgeon
- Stanley Mason, principal and vice-chancellor from 1993-97 of Glasgow Caledonian University (former Glasgow Polytechnic)
- Roy Meadow, Professor of Paediatrics and Child Health from 1980-98 at the University of Leeds, chairman from 1983-84 of the Association for Child Psychology and Psychiatry, and from 1994-96 of the BPA (now the RCPCH since 1996)
- William Ormandy, former President of the Institute of Automobile Engineers
- Norman Pye, Professor of Geography from 1954-79 at the University of Leicester
- Bryan Rigby, chairman from 1998-2009 of the Anglo-German Foundation
- A. G. Rigg, medievalist
- William Roby
- Bryan Talbot, writer and artist, married to Mary M. Talbot, created The Adventures of Luther Arkwright
- William Thomson, editor from 1944-73 of The Practitioner, medical correspondent from 1956-71 of The Times, and from 1971-83 of the Daily Telegraph
- Richard Warburton, director general from 1979-90 of RoSPA
- David Turnock, Professor of Geography Leicester University
- Charles Wilcocks, president from 1963-65 of the Royal Society of Tropical Medicine and Hygiene
- Gerald Wilkinson, illustrator, art historian, naturalist, photographer, artist and book-designer
- Russ Winstanley, began the Northern soul nightclub at Wigan Casino in September 1973, later a broadcaster on Radio Lancashire
