= Care (2000 film) =

- Genre: Crime drama
- Written by: Kieran Prendiville
- Directed by: Antonia Bird
- Starring: Steven Mackintosh; Jaye Griffiths; Maria Pride; Charlotte Cornwell; Peter Wight; Aneirin Hughes; Clive Merrison; Richard Harrington; Rhys Parry Jones
- Composers: Paul Conboy; Adrian Corker
- Country of origin: United Kingdom
- Original language: English
- No. of episodes: 1

Production
- Executive producers: Aled Eirug; Pippa Harris; Jane Tranter
- Producers: Louise Panton; Ruth Caleb
- Cinematography: Graham Smith
- Editor: St. John O'Rorke
- Running time: 105 minutes
- Production company: BBC Wales

Original release
- Network: BBC1
- Release: 8 October 2000

Care is a single British television crime drama film, written by former Tomorrow's World presenter Kieran Prendiville, that first broadcast on BBC1 on 8 October 2000. Directed by Antonia Bird, Care follows Davey Younger (Steven Mackintosh), a former childhood resident of Glenavon care home, who is forced to dig up his past when a local councillor, Tony Collins (Richard Harrington), orders an investigation into reported historical sex abuse, which took place at the home during Davey's years as a resident, following evidence unearthed by journalist Elaine Hughes (Jaye Griffiths). The film won the BAFTA TV Award for Best Single Drama in 2001.

== Broadcast ==
Although described by Prendiville as an entirely fictional piece, Care, which Prendiville spent two and a half years researching, was somewhat based upon a real life case uncovered during the North Wales child abuse scandal. The home itself was said to be based upon Bryn Estyn, and the character of Davey based upon one of the most infamous victims of the scandal, Mark Humphrys.

Immediately following the film's broadcast, a live panel debate, entitled Forgotten Children, was broadcast, chaired by Huw Edwards and featuring panellists including Allan Levy QC and Valerie Howarth, the then-chief executive of Childline. The debate discussed issues raised by the programme and examined why several such scandals have gone unearthed for so long. The film went on to win several awards, including the Cologne International Film Festival Gold for Best Single Drama, a BAFTA award for Best Single Drama, BAFTA Cymru and RTS Television Awards for Best Actor (Mackintosh), and the Prix Italia in Bologna in 2001.

The film was re-broadcast on BBC Four on 22 May 2016, just six months before former police superintendent Gordon Anglesea, whom one of the film's characters is said to be based upon, was sentenced to twelve years in prison for the sexual abuse of a 14 and 15-year-old boy, with one of the victims being a resident of the Bryn Estyn care home, having previously been found innocent of all charges by the High Court and having successfully sued four media organisations for libel in 1994, winning £375,000.

The film attracted a viewing audience of around 4 million, but notably sparked over 6,000 phone calls to police forces across the country to report undiscovered historical sex abuse across care homes across the United Kingdom.

== Reception ==
Cultural historian Richard Webster criticised the piece, claiming that it was "the latest attempt to disseminate a mythical account of events", and describing it as "ill-conceived and misleading". However, Webster's allegation that the abuse at Bryn Estyn was a fabrication motivated by the desire for financial compensation was undermined by a further Police investigation in which further witnesses came forward in the knowledge no further compensation was available.

== Cast ==
- Steven Mackintosh as Davey Younger
- Jaye Griffiths as Elaine Hughes
- Maria Pride as Pauline
- Charlotte Cornwell as Joanne Hallows
- Peter Wight as Francis Chambers
- Aneirin Hughes as Tom Ferguson
- Clive Merrison as Desmond Pickering
- Richard Harrington as Tony Collins
- Rhys Parry Jones as Donald Bainbridge
- Daniel Parker as Young Davey
- Geraint Thomas as John
- Kit Jackson as Ian Chalmers
- Morgan Hopkins as Kite
- Lynn Hunter as Angela
- Huw Davies as DC Price
- William Ivory as DS Devlin
- Dorien Thomas as DC Lorimer
