= HD 112028 =

Star in the constellation Camelopardalis

Observation data Epoch J2000 Equinox J2000
- Constellation: Camelopardalis
- Right ascension: 12^{h} 49^{m} 13.7347^{s}
- Declination: +83° 24′ 46.432″
- Apparent magnitude (V): 5.28

Characteristics
- Spectral type: A0 IIsp
- U−B color index: −0.06
- B−V color index: −0.03

Astrometry
Radial velocity (R_{v})	+2.3 km/s
Proper motion (μ)	RA: −31.517(152) mas/yr Dec.: 20.774(158) mas/yr
Parallax (π)	7.7658±0.1164 mas
Distance	420 ± 6 ly (129 ± 2 pc)

Details
Mass	2.4 M_{☉}
Radius	4.4 R_{☉}
Luminosity	135 L_{☉}
Surface gravity (log g)	2.88±0.13 cgs
Temperature	9,443±345 K
Metallicity [Fe/H]	−0.39±0.22 dex
Rotation	0.799 days
Rotational velocity (v sin i)	275 km/s
Age	387 Myr

Other designations
- BD+84 290, HD 112028, HIP 62572, HR 4893, SAO 2102, Struve 1694A

Database references
SIMBAD	data

HD 112028 is an evolved star in the northern constellation of Camelopardalis. It has spectral peculiarities that have been interpreted as a shell, and also relatively weak magnesium and silicon lines. Its spectral class has been variously assigned between B9 and A2, and its luminosity class between a subgiant and bright giant.

At an angular separation of 21.47″ is the slightly fainter spectroscopic binary HD 112014, consisting of a pair of A-type main sequence stars. HD 112028 and HD 112014 together are known as the binary star Struve 1694.
