= Pi Ursae Minoris =

The Bayer designation Pi Ursae Minoris (π UMi, π Ursae Minoris) is shared by two star systems, π^{1} Ursae Minoris and π^{2} Ursae Minoris, in the constellation Ursa Minor. They are separated by 0.64° on the sky.

- π^{1} Ursae Minoris
- π^{2} Ursae Minoris
