= Dhruvsatya =

Hindi word for "eternal truth"

Dhruvsatya is a term in Hindi that means "eternal truth". The word "dhruv", which literally translates to pole star and may refer to Dhruva, an ascetic devotee of Vishnu who transformed into the pole star as a reward from Vishnu, is used in conjunction with "satya", which means truth. Dhruvsatya means the truth that is as immovable and eternal as the position of the "pole star". The term is widely used in Hindi literature and can be found in Premchand's legendary works.
