= Trinity University College =

University campus and former college in Wales

- Coleg Prifysgol y Drindod
- Established: 1848 (Incorporated 2005)
- Affiliations: University of Wales
- Chancellor: The Prince of Wales
- Principal: Medwin Hughes
- Students: 2,515
- Undergraduates: 1,990
- Postgraduates: 410
- Other students: 120 FE
- Location: Carmarthen; Carmarthenshire SA31 3EP., Carmarthen, Wales, UK; 51.8581°N 4.3286°W

Trinity University College (Welsh: Coleg Prifysgol y Drindod) was a Church University College in Carmarthen, Wales.

The institution was founded in 1848 as the South Wales and Monmouthshire Training College, a teacher-training college. It changed its name in 1931 to Trinity College, Carmarthen; and in 2009 to Trinity University College. In 2010, it merged with the University of Wales, Lampeter to become the new University of Wales Trinity Saint David, with the Trinity site becoming the UWTSD Carmarthen Campus.

== History ==
Trinity University College began life in 1848 as the South Wales and Monmouthshire Training College, making it the oldest teacher training college in continuous operation in Wales. The college's role was to train young men for teaching in Church primary schools. In the first year of operation, 22 students were recruited and were taught by three members of staff including the first Principal, William Reed. Walter Powell is recorded as the first student; he was 17, previously a draper and worked in a grocery store.

The college required its students to follow a strict schedule which included getting up at half past six for a cold bath. Students were often recruited from humble backgrounds, and to remind them of this, the college curriculum included subjects such as gardening and woodwork. The students were expected to have a knowledge of grammar and arithmetic and received education in Latin and Greek. By 1936, the college also had an art block and a gym.

The college also placed restrictions on interaction with the local townspeople, particularly women, and fines were issued for "girling" (interacting with local women). The strict regime of college life was however broken for activities such as smoking and reading newspapers in the common rooms, musical concerts and entertainment. In the late Victorian era, photography became a great hobby at the college. In the inter-war and post-war era, the college gained a strong reputation for sports. The principal sport played was rugby, in which many students went on to achieve considerable success; but other sports included badminton, tennis, and hockey.

An account of college life in the 1930s is provided by ex-student George Head, who wrote that the Old Building and the Dewi Hostel combined contained all of the teaching rooms, a gymnasium, the library, the smoking room and common rooms, the secretarial offices, and the "Sick Ward" and medical facilities. Church was still at this period a large part of the college life. Interaction with women was still forbidden and punishable. Head does however speak of how fond the students were of the college and how much they took away from it. In particular he recounts the old Trinity College Anthem based on There is a Tavern in the Town.

During the Second World War many students were expected to take "fire watches" and serve as lookouts at night, although this job came with little danger in a town like Carmarthen. Many of the students at the college also joined the Home Guard and took part in drills. In 1938 a Broadcast room was constructed, the foundation stone being laid by the Duke of Kent.

In 1931, the college changed its name to Trinity College, Carmarthen. Female students were first admitted in 1957. In 2009, the college achieved "university college" status, and changed its name to Trinity University College.

=== College anthem ===
There is a tavern in the town, in the town
And there my true love settled down, settled down
She read her books so merrily
And never, never thought of me, thought of me.
We came from near and far then, unto Trinity Carmarthen
And we saddened as the days drew near to part, to part
We do, O Trinity, we do, we do, we do
Regard thee with affection true, affection true
I'll hang my hat on the Old Oak Tree,
And may the world go well with thee, well with thee.

=== Merger with University of Wales Lampeter ===
On 14 December 2008, it was announced that Trinity was in merger talks with Lampeter with the intention of forming a new university in Wales. The decision was taken in April 2009 for the merger to go ahead. The name for the newly merged institution would be University of Wales Trinity Saint David. The Welsh Assembly Government announced a £14.03m investment in the newly merged institution in October 2008. The merger formally took place in July 2010.

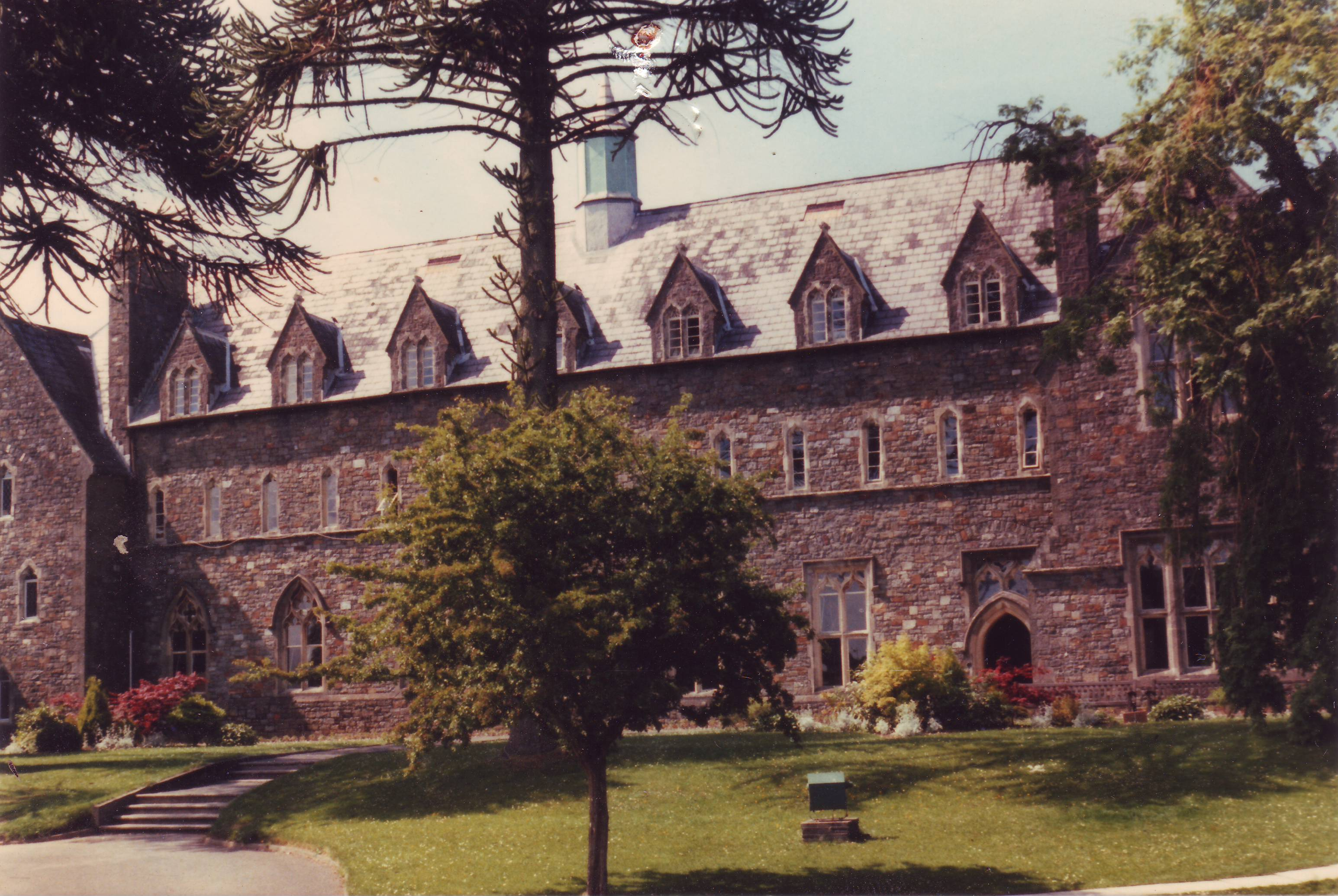
Trinity College, Carmarthen

== Location ==
Trinity College is situated on the outskirts of Carmarthen. It is in a semi-rural setting, surrounded by fields and hills, but is within 10 minutes walk of the town centre. The university is situated around the original Old College of 1848 and is a mixture of lawns and gardens surrounding modern buildings. The main bulk of the university lies along College Road and Job's Well Road, with some buildings situated away from the main grounds. On the outskirts of the town, near the town leisure centre there is the university's outdoor weather pitch. These facilities were inherited by the new university and continue in use today.

== Buildings ==
=== Original buildings ===
==== Old Building ====
The campus is centred on the original 1848 Old Building of Trinity College. It originally contained all of the original dormitories, common rooms, libraries, an original university quadrangle and teaching spaces. The building today houses several lecture theatres and smaller classrooms often used by the university's school of Justice and Social Inclusion (including Psychology) and, Theology, Religious Studies and Islamic Studies.

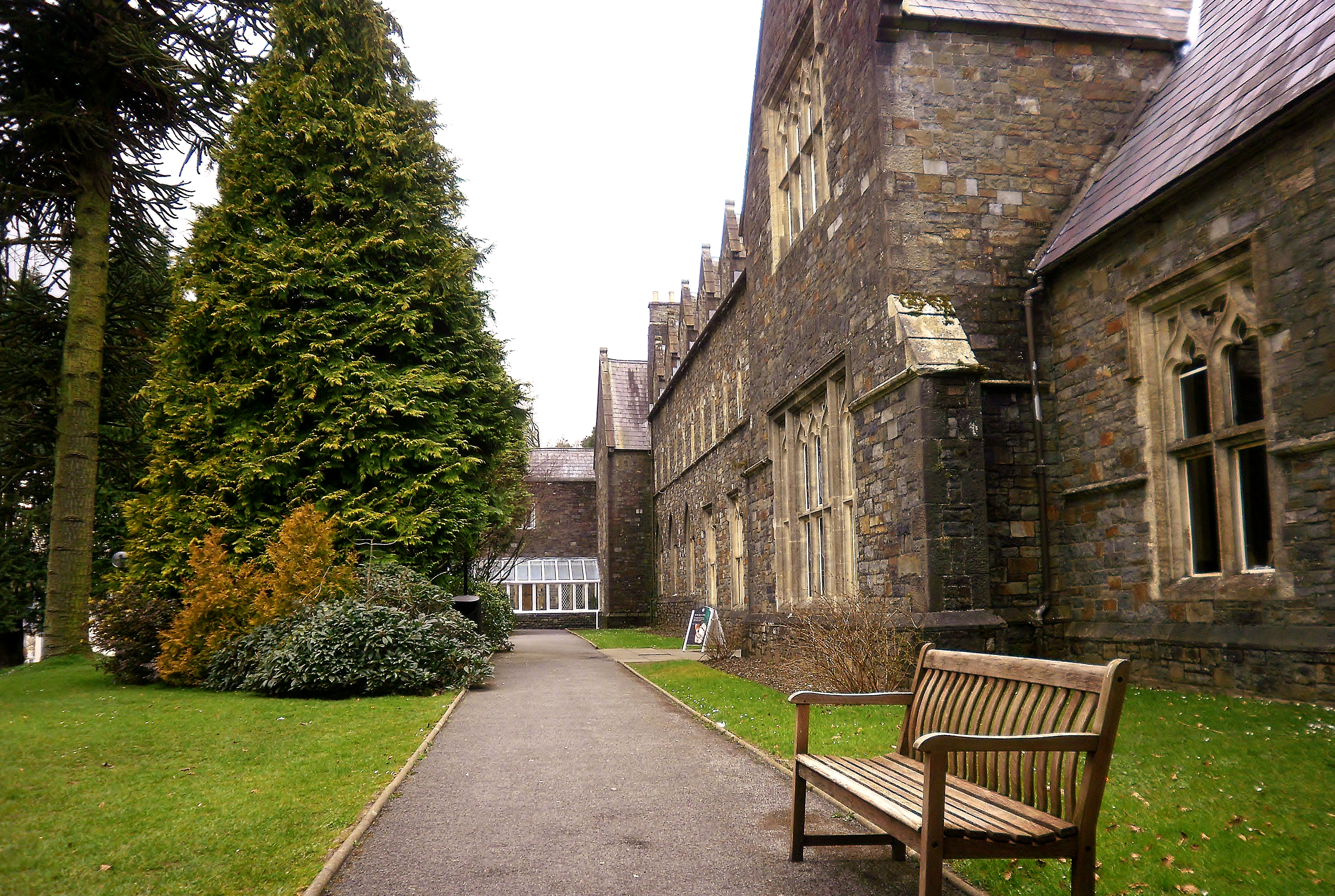
Picture of Old Building Carmarthen

Another feature of the old building of Carmarthen is the Archbishop Childs' hall. Named after Derrick Greenslade Childs, who was Archbishop of Wales, Bishop of Monmouth and director of the Church in Wales. Childs was principal of Trinity from 1965 and died in 1987 shortly after his retirement. The hall is of a classical shape and is hung with framed paintings of Childs. The hall is today used as a venue for conferences, lectures and performances (it contains a grand piano). On the outside of the building, there is a carved crest of the Bishops of Wales. Childs is also commemorated by an upper room in the old building named Archbishop Childs Room.

==== Cwad ====
The original 1848 quadrangle has been modified and renamed the "Cwad". This comprises a collection of computer suites and study rooms as well as a coffee shop located in the Old Library which serves Starbucks coffee and small meals. This area is also home to the university shop which sells daily essentials for learning.

==== Chapel ====
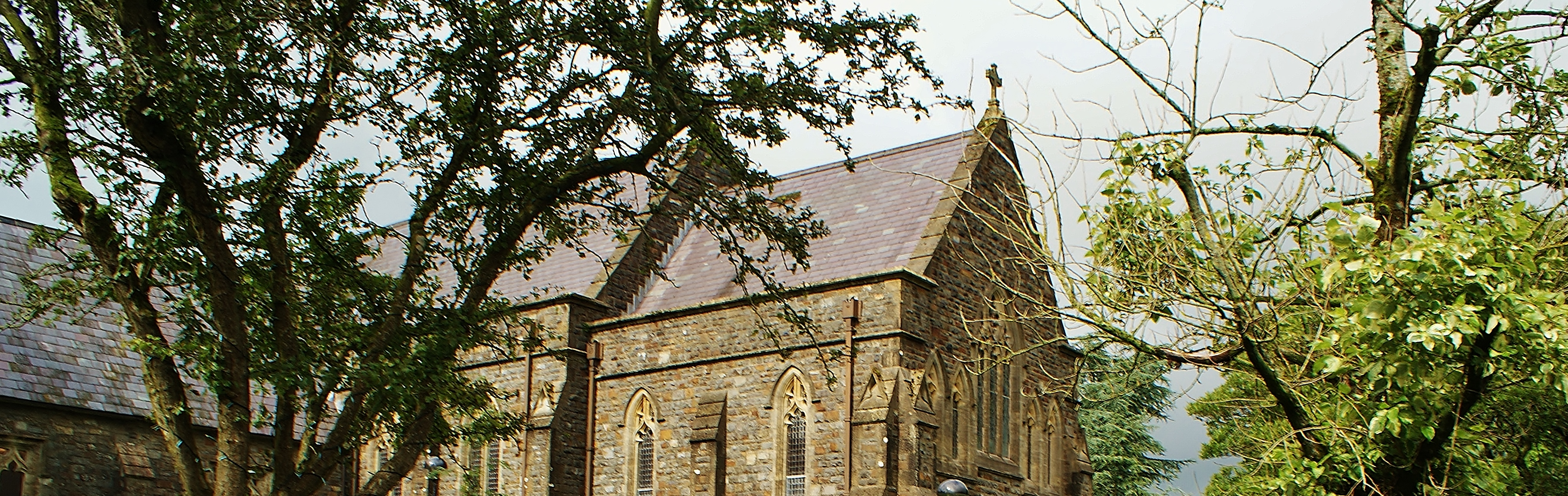
Trinity University College Carmarthen, Chapel building exterior

Attached to the main body of the building is the University Chapel. This space is divided into 3 areas; the main chapel, the ante-chapel and the chaplaincy lounge. The Main chapel is an extension added in 1932, it retains many of its original features such as a large pipe organ and several stained glass features. The ante-chapel is the original 1848 chapel, now dedicated to past students and lecturers who served during the First World War. It has a central font and is decorated with student artwork. Connected to this is the Chaplaincy lounge. This space serves as a comfortable relaxed meeting space for students. It also houses the chaplaincy library, a small collection of literature serving needs of the chapel and its congregation.

=== Later additions ===
==== Halliwell Centre ====
The Halliwell Centre was the college's main conference facility. It is named after Rev. Dr. Thomas Halliwell LL.D. M.A., a former lecturer and principal of the college. The building comprised several large lecture halls, smaller conference rooms and suites, a larger conference hall complete with bar facilities and the Halliwell Theatre, which regularly hosted shows by travelling companies and the universities acclaimed performing arts students. The facilities of the Halliwell were often used by the various schools of the college for lectures and larger seminars. Beneath the main complex were also several more lecture rooms and the drama department.

The Halliwell Centre also housed the Merlin restaurant, which was the main refectory for catered students.

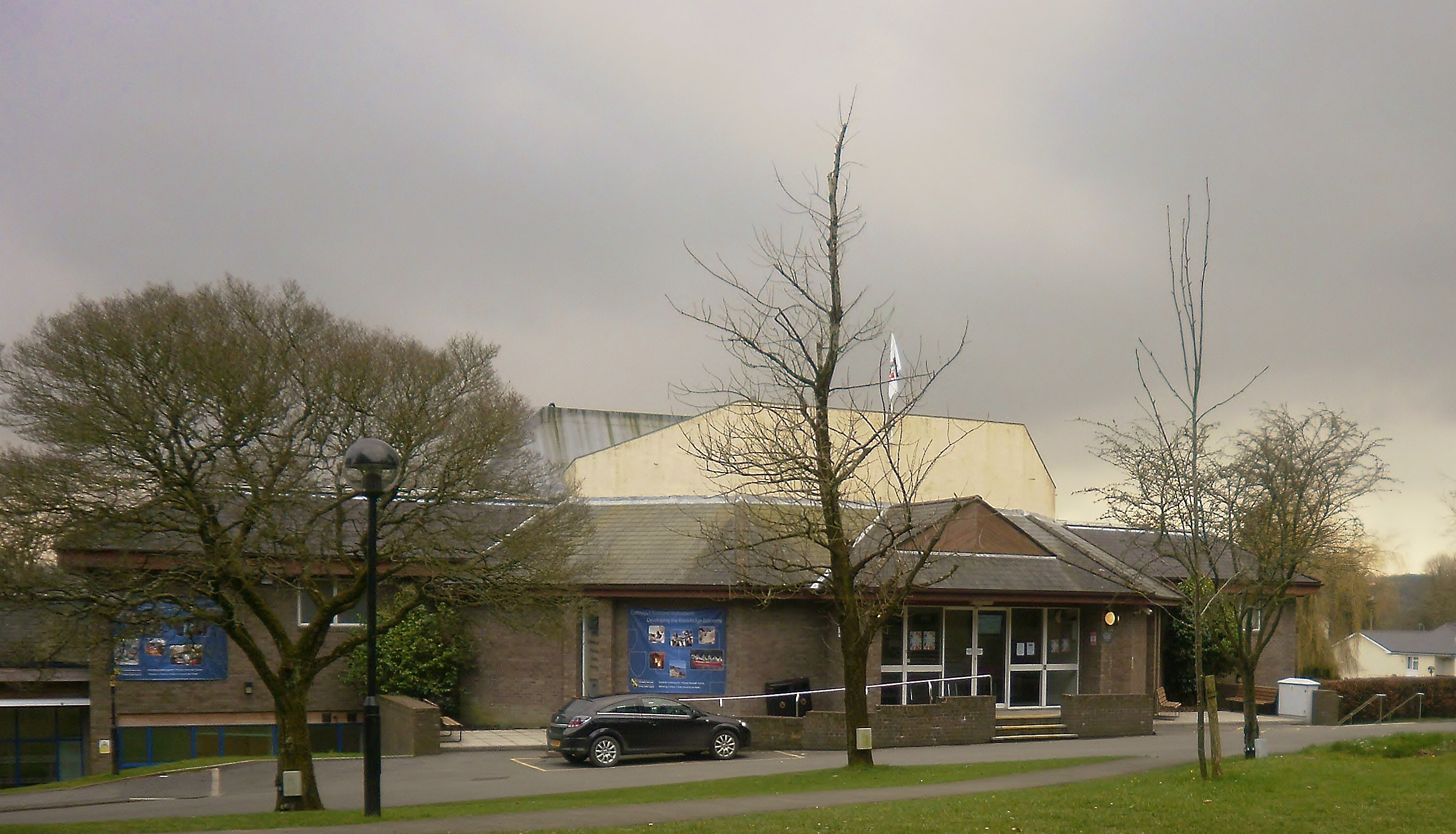
Halliwell Building, Trinity University College Carmarthen

==== Carwyn James Building ====
This building was named after Carwyn James, a rugby player and former lecturer of the college. This facility was home to the Faculty of Education and Training. It was used to teach degrees such as primary education and its interior was designed to resemble that of a school building. On the second floor of the building, overlooking the quadrangle was the college's 'Quiet Study Facility'.

==== Emyr Wyn Evans Building ====
This building housed office space, music suites and practice rooms for the School of Performing Arts. Adjoining this building was the School's main workshop for the degree of theatre production and design.

==== Dewi Building ====
The Dewi building was originally built in 1925 as the Dewi Hostel. It was an extension of the original old college and served as an extra wing for student accommodation. An account of the conditions of the hostel survives from a student living in them at the time: "To keep oneself warm in the new wing during the Winter months was a problem for although it had a system of heating, the heat seldom reached even the second floor. To wash we depended on the rain-water caught in the roof of the building and this was always cold". In 2010 the building was refurbished and modernised, primarily as office space. It contained the university's main reception, finance office and registry as well as IT facilities which were sometimes used by the School of Business and Tourism.

==== Students' Union ====
The Students' Union building was the centre of student social life on the campus. Constructed in 1971 it comprised two main venues: the Attic Bar which, at a later date, served food and drinks, and downstairs "Unity", the main entertainment venue of the Union. When first open, upstairs was used as a lounge area and student Union offices. The downstairs facility hosted club nights as well as other social events. The Union incorporated many societies, ranging from sports such as rugby and hockey to historical societies.

==== Learning Resources Centre ====
The main library of the campus was constructed in 1995 to accommodate resources for the growing diversity of subjects studied, and was located opposite the Parry Block. It was dedicated to the poet Raymond Garlick, who was a principal lecturer in Trinity's Welsh Department. It contained a total of 110,000 books along with academic journals and DVDs. It also housed public computers, printing and photocopying facilities. The first floor contained the bulk of the main collection as well as specialist collections, IT spaces and larger collections. The second floor contained quieter working spaces and the rest of the main collection.

==== Parry Block ====
Named after Canon Parry, a former head of the college, the Parry Block contained a variety of teaching facilities which were used largely by the university's School of Justice and Social inclusion and School of Creative Arts. These included large classrooms and smaller art studios.

==== Norah Isaac ====
Named after Norah Isaac, a former lecturer and important figure in Welsh drama, this building had a selection of classrooms and lecture suites. Degrees in English and Creative Writing were also taught in this building. It was located directly opposite the Parry Building.

==== Robert Hunter ====
Named after Robert Hunter, this building contained laboratories, classrooms and lecture halls used by the School of Sport, Health and Outdoor Education. The facility was located near the Myrddin Accommodation blocks, and was surrounded by picturesque gardens and ponds.

==== Dafydd Rowlands ====
Named after the author Dafydd Rowlands, this building was the hub of the School of Film and Visual Media. It was used by many of the creative arts degrees and contained lecture rooms, crafting spaces and an office space for the School of Visual Media.

== Student life ==
=== Student Union ===
The students' union building at the college was constructed in 1972 for the purposes of serving the growing number of students deciding to live on campus. It was a large building, complete with a club called Unity and the Attic Bar. Trinity had several sporting and academic societies and clubs run by the union. The university college also had a Christian Union and Amnesty groups.

== Accommodation ==
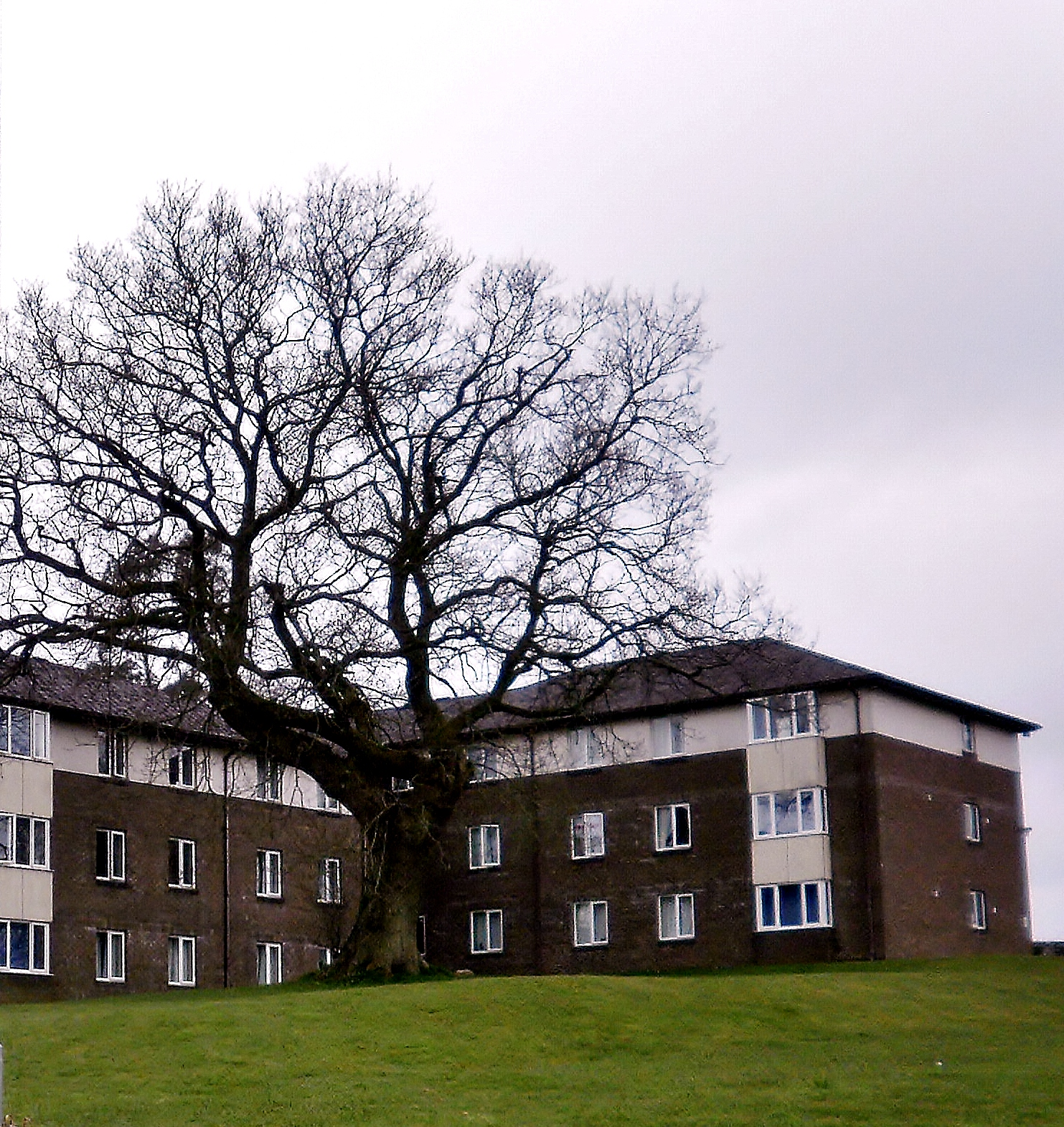
Archbishop Noakes Hall of Residence

- Archbishop Noakes Hall: this was a large accommodation facility that was split into three sections. It could house hundreds of students and was reserved for returning students. The Blocks were all self catered, each room is en-suite, and are divided into flats of eight with one kitchen per flat.
- Myrddin Hall: this was a catered first year hall, built in the late 1960s to accommodate growing numbers of students. The Halls had shared common room space and shared bathrooms.
- Non Hall: originally built in 1957 opposite the old Dewi Hostel to accommodate the first female students. The building had similar facilities to the Myrddin Halls. It remained a single-sex, female block up until the merger, and was reserved for first year catered students.
- Tower Hall: this too was a first year catered block. It was 10 storeys tall and could accommodate many students.
- Picton Hall: Situated on Picton Terrace by the junction with Picton Place, this was used during the 1990s as accommodation for male and female students. It comprised three Georgian houses, two of which were joined via a door on the top-floor. Each house was single-sex. The both co-joined houses housed either all-male or all-female students. Picton residents had their own kitchens but could choose to eat their meals on campus in the canteen. During the late 1990s the hall was unsupervised by a warden and was in poor repair. The buildings are no longer part of the university.

The college could accommodate 600 of its students, though many elected to live in private accommodation in town.

== Sports ==
Trinity had a long history of sport and from its very beginnings sport played an important role in students' life. Rugby was an important and strong tradition at Trinity and many of its alumni went on to become very successful in the sport.

=== Facilities ===
Shortly before the merger, the college had a fully equipped gymnasium and sports hall. It had a climbing wall, a swimming pool, tennis courts and an astroturf. It also had large playing fields and an all-weather pitch near the town leisure centre. Sport was also studied academically through the Schools of Nutrition Health and Exercise and Sport, Health and Outdoor Education.

== Performing arts ==
The campus' general workshop and costume workshops were used by students of theatre design. Venues for theatrical performances included a tiered theatre in the Halliwell Centre, a 160-seat facility with a sprung floor which could be used for dance rehearsals, Theatr Parry, and Theatr Fach (which contained a green screen and was used as a recording studio).

== Creative arts ==
The college housed workshops designed for different arts and crafts such as woodwork, fine art and ceramics. There were also modern media suites which allowed students to engage with 2D and 3D moving artwork and an Apple Mac lab equipped with dual core i-Macs, as well as Mac Pro towers to enable students to have an industry standard experience. In addition, the campus was home to the "final cut" film studio and recording and editing studios used by Film and Media students.

== Courses ==
Historically, Trinity College was primarily concerned with the discipline of teacher training. It had a long and constant history with the subject. This tradition continued throughout the institution's history and the college became one of the UK's chief providers of the subject. As it developed, Trinity College began to teach a wide range of subjects including:

- Business and Tourism
- IT, Computer and Internet technology
- Health Science, Nutritional science, and Sports Science
- Social Inclusion and Justice
- Psychology
- Religious Studies, Theology and Islamic Studies
- Drama and Theatre Production
- Performance Art, Vocal studies
- Physical Education, Outdoor Education
- Art and Design
- Film, Media and Photography
- Childhood Studies
- Archaeology
- English and Creative Writing
- Heavy Craft (Woodwork & Metalwork)
- Mathematics

After obtaining university status, the college also began awarding postgraduate degrees.

== Alumni ==
Former students include BBC Wales television producer and executive John Hefin; rugby players Dewi Bebb, Jonathan Davies and Barry John; singers Stuart Burrows and Rhys Meirion; Pam Evans, founder of Peace Mala; writers Gwyn Morgan, Eirug Wyn, and John Owen. Former lecturers include Raymond Garlick, Norah Isaac, Islwyn Ffowc Elis, Carwyn James, Wyn Evans and Dafydd Rowlands.

== See also ==
- List of universities in Wales
