= Norah Isaac =

Welsh author and advocate of Welsh-language education, 1914–2003

Norah Isaac (1914 – 3 August 2003) was a Welsh author, drama producer and campaigner for Welsh-language education. She became head of the country's first Welsh-medium school, Ysgol Gymraeg yr Urdd, in 1939.

== Background ==
Norah Isaac was born in 1914 in the village of Caerau near Maesteg in the old county of Glamorgan, Wales. She was educated at Glamorgan Training College in Barry.

== Welsh-language advocate ==
Isaac was an advocate of the Welsh language. In 1935 she became head of the Glamorgan division of Urdd Gobaith Cymru, a Welsh-medium youth movement, remaining there until her appointment as founding head of Ysgol Gymraeg yr Urdd in 1939, the country's first school to teach in Welsh.

When Ysgol Gymraeg yr Urdd opened as a private school, Isaac was the sole teacher and there were only seven pupils. The success Isaac brought to it caused annual growth, until by 1945 there were four teachers and 71 pupils in an original building was too small for its purpose. The school moved to a country house near Llanbadarn and changed its name to Ysgol Lluest. Isaac remained as head teacher until 1949. During her time there she and Ifan ab Owen Edwards, who established the school, campaigned for the introduction of Welsh-medium schools throughout Wales. Between 1950 and 1958 she lectured at her old college in Barry, before becoming the principal lecturer in Welsh and Drama at Trinity College Carmarthen, establishing the first Welsh Drama Department in Wales.

== Publications and plays ==
Isaac published several books, including two collections of short stories, Storiau Awr Hamdden i Blant (1979 and 1982), and a monograph on Sir Ifan ab Owen Edwards. She also wrote travel books, after visits to Brazil, Argentina and Colombia. She produced several plays based on major Welsh cultural figures, notably Iolo Morganwg (1974), Griffith Jones (1984) and William Williams (1991).

== Honours ==
Along with her drama and literary work, Isaac was an important figure in the National Eisteddfod and awarded an Honorary Fellowship of the National Eisteddfod for her lifelong commitment, the first woman to be given this honour. After her death in August 2003, Iolo Wyn Williams declared in his book Our Children's Language: The Welsh-Medium Schools of Wales, 1939–2000 that Isaac was "the most influential individual in the history of Welsh-medium education".

== Bibliography ==
- Williams, Iolo Wyn (2003). Our Children's Language: The Welsh-Medium Schools of Wales, 1939-2000. Cardiff: Y Lolfa. ISBN 9780862437046.
