= Gwyn Morgan (writer) =

Welsh author

Gwyn Morgan (born 28 May 1954) is a Welsh-language author.

== Background and career ==
Born and raised in Trecynon near Aberdare, as the only son of Gilbert and Margaret Morgan.

He was educated at Ysgol Gymraeg Ynyslwyd, Aberdâr, Ysgol Gyfun Rhydfelen, Pontypridd; and Trinity College, Carmarthen.

He has been a teacher in Ysgol Gymraeg Gilfach Fargoed and in Ysgol Gymraeg Ynyslwyd, Aberdar. He currently works as an advisory teacher with a company in Trefforest.

He is married to Joyce [Morgan] who was head of the Welsh department at Blaengwawr Comprehensive School. His stepson is the Welsh Nationalist academic, Dafydd Trystan Davies.

He published his first poem in Y Faner in 1976.

He lives near the small village of Penderyn.

== Bibliography ==
- Dannedd Gosod Ben (Gwasg y Dref Wen) 1989
- Caliban a Cherddi eraill (Gomer) 1993
- Zac yn y Pac (Gwasg y Dref Wen) 1994 with Dai Owen
- Rwba Dwba (Dref Wen) 1995 (with Dai Owen)
- Hari Hyll yr Ail (Dref Wen) 1996 (with Dai Owen)
- Ben ar ei Wyliau (Dref Wen) 1996 (with Dai Owen)
- Y Paffiwr a cherddi eraill (Gomer)1997
- Zac yn Grac (Gwasg y Dref Wen) 1999 gyda Dai Owen
- Llew Lletchwith (Gwasg y Dref Wen) 2000
- Jazz (Gwasg y Dref Wen) 2001 (with Dai Owen)
- Psst (Gwasg y Dref Wen) 2002 (with Dai Owen)
- Abracadabra (Dref Wen) 2002(with Dai Owen)
- Isi a'r Cloch (Gwasg y Dref Wen) 2003 (with Dai Owen)
- Twpsyn (Gwasg y Dref Wen) 2004 (with Dai Owen)
- Babi Ben (Gwasg y Dref Wen) 2004 (with Dai Owen)
- Ailgylchu Alwyn (Gwasg y Dref Wen) 2005 (with Dai Owen)
- Tu Chwith (Dref Wen) 2006 (with Dai Owen)
- Jocs Gwirion Gwyn a Dai (Gwasg Carreg Gwalch) 2006 (with Dai Owen)
- Posau Gwallgo (Dref Wen) 2007 (with Dai Owen)
- Dyg a Def Diawledig (Gwasg y Dref Wen) 2011 (with Dai Owen)

Gwyliau Pitw (Gwasg y Dref Wen) 2014 (with Dai Owen). Pogo Ping-Pong Gwasg y Dref Wen(2016) with Dai Owen Tricsi a Dicsi (Gwasg y Dref Wen) 2019 (with Dai Owen).

Gweithdai

- Gweithdy Ysgrifennu Creadigol, Merthyr Tudful, Ebrill 2012
- Gweithdai Ysgrifennu Creadigol yn Ynys Mon, Mawrth 2012
- Gweithdy Ysgrifennu creadigol ag Ysgol Gymraeg Llantrisant, Hydref 2012.
- Sgwad Sgwennu – Merthyr Tudful Hydref 2012
- Writing workshop – Histories and Mysteries – Merthyr Tudful October 2012
- Sgwad Sgwennu – Prifysgol y Drindod/Dewi Sant, Caerfyddin, Tachwedd 2012.
- Writing workshop – Twynyrodyn, Merthyr Tudful, December 2013.
- Gweithdy barddoniaeth yn Ysgol Gymraeg Cwm Garw, Mawrth 2013
