= T Ursae Minoris =

Star in the constellation Ursa Minor

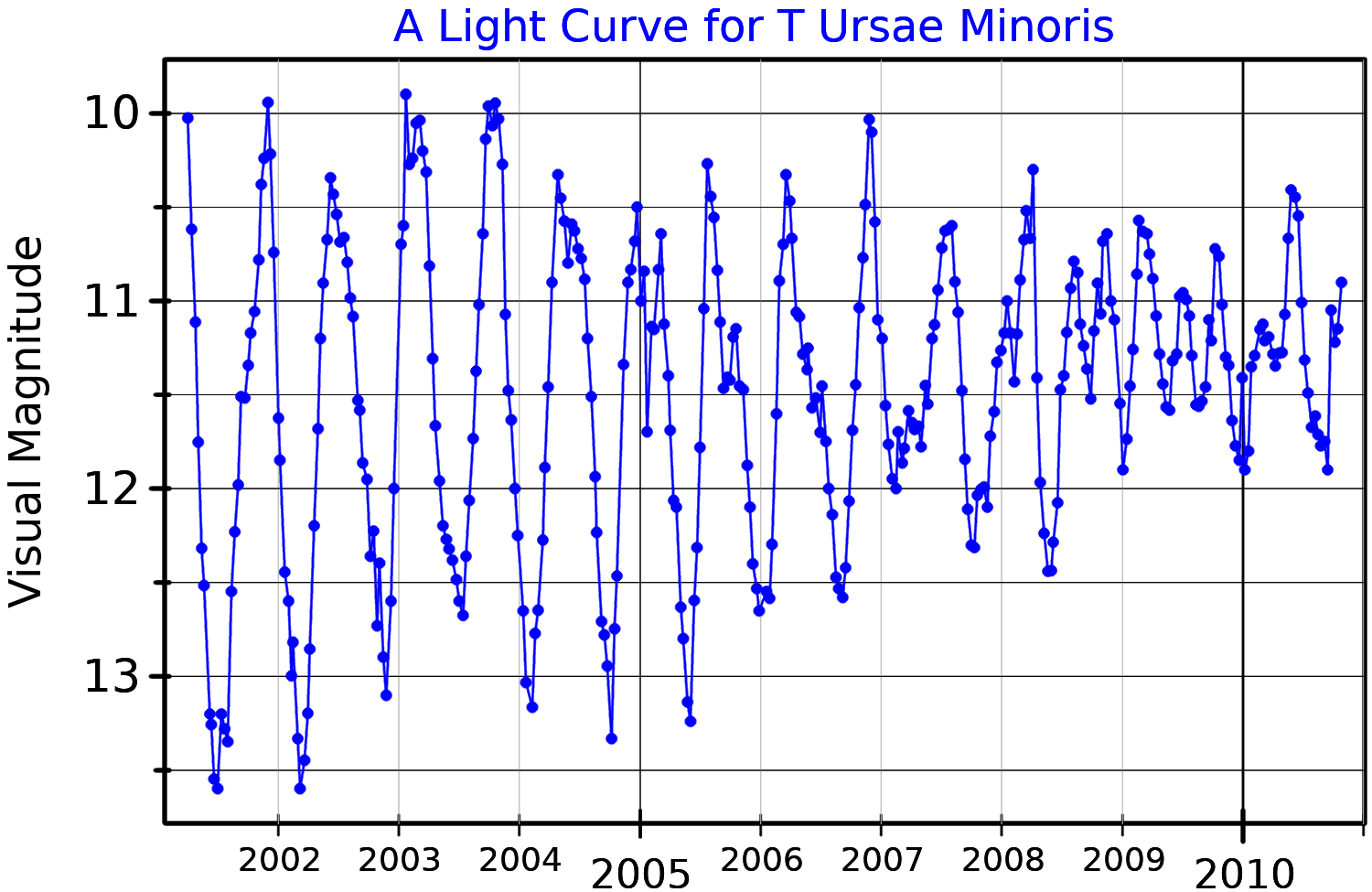
- A visual band light curve for T Ursae Minoris, adapted from Uttenthaler et al. (2011)

Observation data Epoch J2000.0 Equinox J2000.0
- Constellation: Ursa Minor
- Right ascension: 13^{h} 34^{m} 41.072^{s}
- Declination: +73° 25′ 53.08″
- Apparent magnitude (V): 7.8 - 15

Characteristics
- Spectral type: M4e-M6e
- Variable type: SR (previously Mira)

Astrometry
Radial velocity (R_{v})	−9 km/s
Proper motion (μ)	RA: −12.919 mas/yr Dec.: +5.826 mas/yr
Parallax (π)	0.7843±0.0502 mas
Distance	4,200 ± 300 ly (1,280 ± 80 pc)

Details

Before onset of period change
Mass	1.66±0.10 M_{☉}
Radius	290±15 R_{☉}
Luminosity	4,080 L_{☉}
Temperature	3,200±30 K
Metallicity [Fe/H]	−0.07 dex
Age	0.17±0.21 Gyr

Other designations
- T UMi, HD 118556, TYC 4408-163-1, GSC 04408-00163, 2MASS J13344108+7325530, Gaia DR2 1688437478979868288

Database references
SIMBAD	data

T Ursae Minoris (T UMi) is a variable star in the constellation Ursa Minor, located 2′30″ west-southwest of 3 Ursae Minoris toward the western border of the constellation with Draco.

== Properties ==
In 1903, Lidiiya Ceraski discovered that T Ursae Minoris is a variable star. A red giant ranging between spectral types M4e and M6e and with a surface temperature of 3,300 K, T Ursae Minoris is a long period semiregular variable star ranging from magnitude 7.8 to 15. These are highly evolved ageing stars that are on the asymptotic giant branch, their wide range in magnitude making them ideal targets for monitoring by amateur star observers.

T Ursae Minoris has been monitored closely since 1905. Up until 1979, its brightness had varied over a period of 310 to 315 days and it was classified as a Mira variable. However, from 1979 its period decreased suddenly to 274 days, and appeared to be decreasing by 2.75 days a cycle since. Variable star observers Janet Mattei and Grant Foster proposed that the star had just undergone a shell helium flash – a point at which "the helium shell around the dense core of the star reaches a critical mass and ignites", which "influences the star's pulsation via changes in surface luminosity and radius". By mid 2008, its period had decreased to 230 days, before changing to pulsation as a semiregular variable star, with a dominant period of 113.6 days. This has been the most dramatic change of any Mira variable. The lack of technetium in its spectrum indicates it is not as advanced in age as some other Mira-type stars, as it has either not yet dredged up this sort of material from its core or is of insufficient mass for this to occur.

A model of T Ursae Minoris shows that following a thermal pulse, its properties are expected to change over a period of only a few years. The period would reduce gradually for about 35 years and then decrease dramatically from about 300 days to about 100 days as the pulsations switch from the fundamental mode to the first overtone. At the same time, the radius and luminosity would decrease from around 4,000 L_{☉} and 222 R_{☉} respectively to about 1,500 L_{☉} and 109 R_{☉}. The radius and luminosity would then increase slowly over the next few thousand years to become larger than before the thermal pulse. Multiple thermal pulses are expected to occur in stars at this stage of their lives, about 100,000 years apart, with the star become gradually larger and cooler until it eventually sheds its outer layers to become a white dwarf. T Ursae Minoris is expected to reach its smallest size in about 50 years time, then begin to slowly increase in size and luminosity again.
