= Ysgol Garth Olwg =

Comprehensive school in Wales

Coordinates: 51.565°N 3.324°W

Location
- Main Road; Church Village (nr Pontypridd), Rhondda Cynon Taf, CF38 1DX; Wales

Information
- Type: Comprehensive School
- Motto: Deuparth ffordd eu gwybod
- Established: 1962; 64 years ago -> Ysgol Gyfun Rhydfelen
- Founder: Gwilym Humphreys
- Local authority: Rhondda Cynon Taf
- Head teacher: Trystan Edwards
- Gender: Co-educational
- Age: 3 to 18
- Enrolment: 860
- Language: Welsh
- Houses: 3: Aran, Clydach, Dowlais
- Colours: Blue, Grey, Black, Red, Green
- Publication: Bytholwyrdd
- Website: www.gartholwg.org.uk

Ysgol Garth Olwg (previously named Ysgol Gyfun Rhydfelen and Ysgol Gyfun Garth Olwg), English Garth Olwg School is a Welsh-medium comprehensive school in the village of Church Village near Pontypridd, in the county borough of Rhondda Cynon Taf, Wales. It was the first Welsh language comprehensive school in the south of Wales.

Attention was brought upon the school in 2009 with the revival of a campaign to retain the name of Ysgol Gyfun Rhydfelen, for reasons of historical significance, in protest over the local council's decision to rename the school Ysgol Gyfun Garth Olwg.

== Description ==
Ysgol Gyfun Garth Olwg is a Welsh medium school, all subjects apart from English are taught in the Welsh language.

Approximately 1,000 pupils are on the school roll, including 160 studying at sixth form. About ninety-two percent of pupils come from homes where the main language is English as against eight percent from homes where Welsh is the main language. A new school magazine, Bytholwyrdd, has been published every quarter since 2006.

The school itself consists of five blocks; Berthlwyd, Celyn, Drysgoed, Maendy and Pentwyn.

The school currently has six feeder primary schools. They are:

Ysgol Gynradd Gymraeg Castellau (Beddau), Ysgol Gynradd Gymraeg Evan James (Pontypridd), Ysgol Gynradd Gymraeg Garth Olwg (Church Village), Ysgol Gynradd Heol-y-celyn, Ysgol Gynradd Gymraeg Gwaelod y Garth, Ysgol Gynradd Gymraeg Pont Sion Norton.(Pontypridd)

=== School badge ===
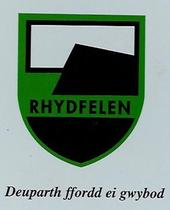
The Old School Badge

The old school badge depicted a coal tip or a mountain of coal which was once a common sight in the locality and the green is the grass growing down below. It was supposed to symbolise that the Welsh language will one day grow over the people like the grass will one day grow over the mountain of coal.

The new badge depicts a mountain range in the shape of a 'G', for Garth Olwg and Gymraeg ("Cymraeg" meaning the Welsh language, with a soft mutation). The mountain is the Garth Mountain, where the school derives its name.

== History ==
Ysgol Rhydfelen (Now Ysgol Gyfun Garth Olwg) was established in 1962 in the village of Rhydyfelin near Pontypridd. It was the first Welsh-language comprehensive school in the south of Wales and the second to be established in the country. In the first year 80 pupils were on the school roll.

Gwilym Humphreys was the first headmaster of Ysgol Rhydfelen. He was born in Wallasey, England, the son of a Presbyterian minister and raised in the mining village of Rhosllannerchrugog, Denbighshire.

As the school grew, a house system was developed to group the children. In Welsh they were called llysoedd (plural; llys singular). Up to 1973 there were three Houses: Dinefwr (dark blue), Ifor Hael (red) and Sycharth (yellow). In 1973, when the school had grown to nearly 1,000 pupils, the number of llysoedd was increased to six. They were named Dafydd (dark blue), Gruffydd (light blue), Hywel (yellow), Iolo (red), Llywelyn (purple), and Owain (orange).

The school had its own magazine called Na Nog, which was published annually.

The buildings were grouped roughly into three blocks and named after the Welsh kingdoms of Gwent, Powys and Dyfed. The buildings in Gwent were the oldest and dated from the Second World War. Powys was a three-storey building with classrooms, a canteen (called y ffreutur), a swimming pool and staff offices. Dyfed was a two-storey building with classrooms, a hall and the school library. The school gymnasium burned down and was replaced by a new gymnasium in approximately 1977. The Ysgol Rhydfelen buildings were opened for the last time on 8 July 2006 for ex-pupils, teachers and parents to pay a final visit. The gymnasium survived intact until 2007, when the school site was demolished. The old school site also had a large on-site Rugby Field, and tennis courts.

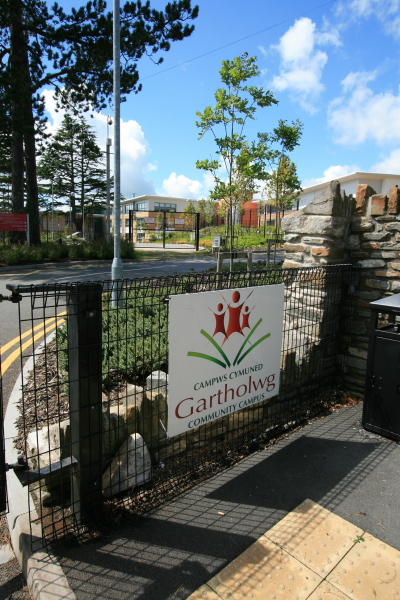
New Campus

In September 2006, the school moved to a new site as part of the Gartholwg Community Campus complex in Church Village, which consists of Ysgol Gynradd Garth Olwg Welsh medium primary school, Church Village library, Garth Olwg nursery, Garth Olwg Lifelong Learning Centre and the replacement building for Ysgol Gyfun Rhydfelen.

In 2011, the school received a Band Five (lowest) rating by the Welsh Assembly Government.

== School name ==
When the school re-located to the Garth Olwg campus in 2006, Rhondda Cynon Taf County Borough Council stated that a name change, to Ysgol Gyfun Garth Olwg, was logical. However, this change was met with opposition from pupils, parents, former pupils, and staff at the school, who wished to retain the old name, Ysgol Gyfun Rhydfelen, in order to retain the identity of the school and the historical associations that its name held.

The petitions committee of the Welsh Assembly heard a petition, presented by the acting head teacher Philip Ellis, in October and November 2007.

On 16 March 2009, a letter was released, from the chairman of the governing body, informing the school's parents and pupils of the recent decision by the governing body in relation to the name of the school. In a meeting of the governing body with representatives of the local authority in the autumn term of 2008 (with no pupil representation), it was pressed upon the governors that the legal name of the school was Ysgol Gyfun Garth Olwg and that it was required to recognise this. Realising that it had no real choice in the matter, the governing body voted to recognise Ysgol Gyfun Garth Olwg as the name of the school.

Although the name of the school continued to be Garth Olwg officially, events at the start of 2009 meant that the school's name was re-considered. Certain Rhondda Cynon Taf councillors supported the continuation of Rhydfelen. Rhondda Cynon Taf County Borough Council considered the issue in a meeting held on 22 April 2009, deciding not to change the name back to Rhydfelen.

== Clywch enquiry on child abuse ==
The report of the Clywch enquiry on allegations of [child sex abuse] at Ysgol Gyfun Rhydfelen was published in June 2004 following a Public Inquiry chaired by Peter Clarke, Children's Commissioner for Wales. Clywch is the Welsh word for 'hear'.

The report highlighted serious failings within the school and Education Authority which allowed the drama teacher John Owen to abuse pupils over a number of years. Complaints about Owen dated back to 1983/4 but were ignored.

After the publication of the Clywch Report, nine former pupils of the school brought a legal action to claim damages for the injuries caused to them. All nine cases were settled before trial by December 2008.

== Examination results ==
At GCSE, the percentage of pupils gaining at least five grades A*-C, including English/Welsh and Maths is 57%.

== Notable former pupils ==
The notable alumni in the following list attended 'Ysgol Gyfun Rhydfelen' pre 2006:

Actors: Richard Harrington, Ieuan Rhys, Jeremi Cockram, Daniel Evans, Richard Lynch, Lisa Palfrey, Maria Pride, and Geraint Todd.

Computer scientist Rob Hartill who is best known for his work on the Internet Movie Database website and the Apache web server.

Broadcasters and Journalists: BBC political reporter and presenter Ciaran Jenkins.

Politicians: Jon Owen Jones MP, Bethan Jenkins AM, Delyth Evans former AM, and Dafydd Trystan Davies, former Chief Executive of Plaid Cymru.

Sports-players include footballers Owain Warlow who played for Welsh League Club Llanelli, Matthew Maksimovic who earned 5 Wales Veterans Caps and also played for Pontypridd Town and Merthyr Tydfil FC, and Welsh international rugby player Kevin Morgan.

Writers and poets: Gwyneth Lewis, first National Poet for Wales, Gwyn Morgan (writer) and Catrin Dafydd.

== Notable former members of staff ==
Huw Bunford guitarist in the rock band, Super Furry Animals was former Head of Art at the school.

John Owen, creator of the Welsh Television children's series. Pam Fi Duw? and author of the series of books of the same name, was a Drama teacher at the school. He committed suicide in 2001 after having been arrested and charged with serious criminal offences against children.

== Gallery ==
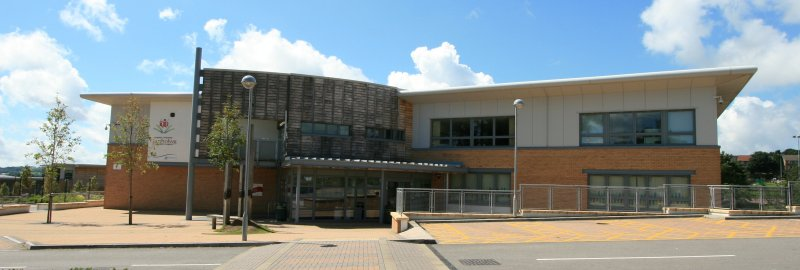

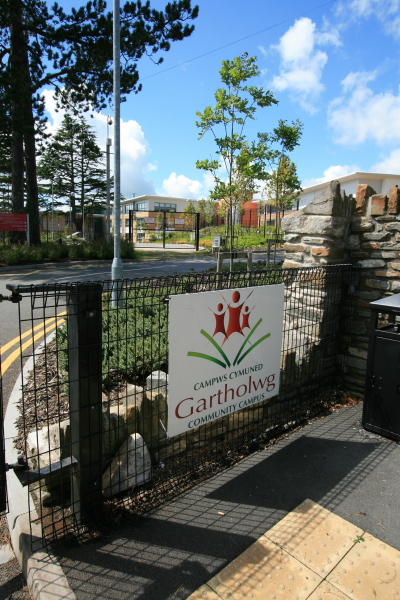

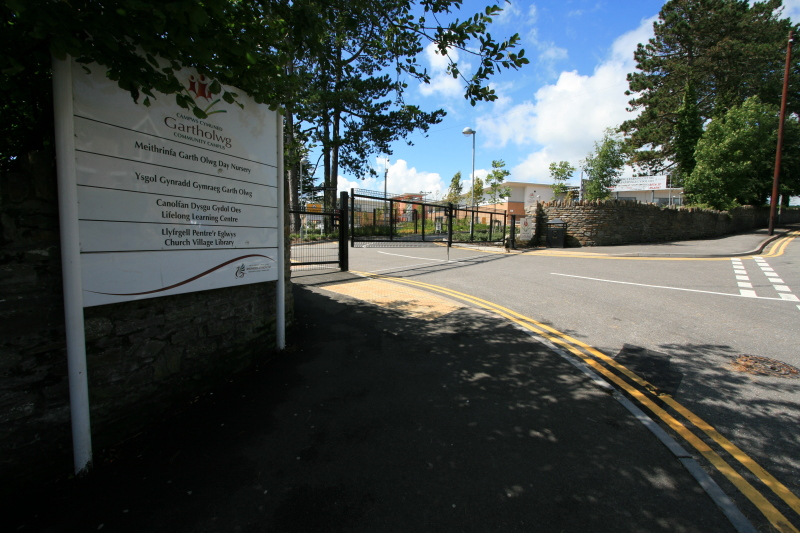

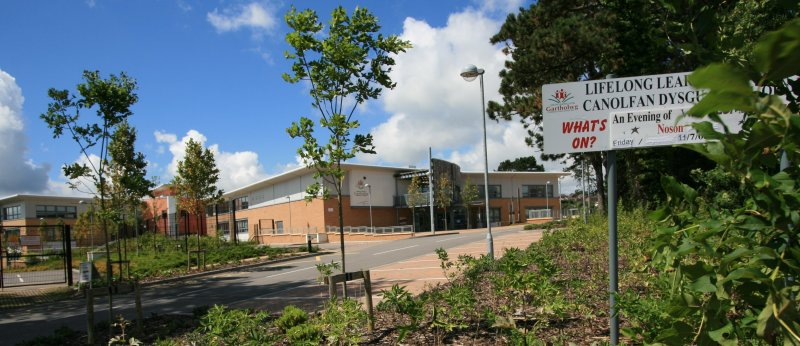
