= A. G. Rigg =

British academic and medievalist (1937-2019)

Arthur George Rigg (17 February 1937 – 7 January 2019) was a British academic and medievalist.

Rigg was born in Wigan on 17 February 1937, and attended Wigan Grammar School. He enrolled at Pembroke College, Oxford between 1955 and 1959, and also earned a doctorate at Oxford University. As a doctoral student, Rigg taught at Merton College and Balliol College. Rigg was visiting assistant professor at Stanford University from 1966 to 1968, after which he moved to the University of Toronto.

Rigg dedicated himself to two initiatives designed to make the University of Toronto a high standard academic environment for learning and studying medieval Latin in North America. Both initiatives were undertaken in close collaboration with the academic staff at the Pontifical Institute of Mediaeval Studies. The first involved a new Latin programme, comprising two different levels, M.A. and PhD. Rigg chaired the Latin committee and taught the M.A. and PhD Latin courses in alternate years. The rigorous Latin standards established by him made the Toronto Latin programme unique. The second initiative was the Toronto Medieval Latin Texts series. Rigg was the editor between 1972 and 2008 during which time thirty volumes were printed, including his own A Book of British Kings: 1200 BC–1399 AD. The idea behind the series was to provide students and instructors with affordable editions of representative Latin texts which were based on selected manuscripts and included notes for the student. During his academic career, Rigg wrote over sixty articles in books or leading academic journals.

Rigg was elected a fellow of the Medieval Academy of America in 1997 and of the Royal Society of Canada in 1998, and was granted emeritus status upon retirement in 2002. He died on 7 January 2019.
