= Peace Mala =

The Peace Mala Youth Project for World Peace
- Abbreviation: Peace Mala
- Formation: 27 November 2002; 23 years ago, UNA Temple of Peace, Cardiff, Wales
- Type: Charitable organisation
- Legal status: Non-profit
- Headquarters: Peace Mala Registered Office
- Location: Morriston, Swansea, Wales
- CEO: Pam Evans MBE
- Key people: Pam Evans Founder/Director; Norma Glass MBE Director/Secretary; Martin Green Director
- Website: peacemala.org.uk

Peace Mala (The Peace Mala Project for Global Citizenship and World Peace), is a British registered charity based in Morriston in Swansea, Wales dedicated to fostering inter-cultural, inter-faith tolerance, and promoting international humans rights and dignity. According to Peace Mala's memorandum, the project aims to "advance the education of the public in global citizenship" and to "promote human rights as set out in the Universal Declaration of Human Rights and subsequent United Nations conventions and declarations".

Peace Mala is an educational project that provides resources to schools and community groups. The symbolic double rainbow Peace Mala bracelet is one such resource, either provided pre-made, or through kits encouraging schools and groups to create their own whilst contemplating the various world faiths and lessons represented by each bead.

Peace Mala focuses on the Golden Rule: "Treat others as you would wish them to treat you".

== History ==
Peace Mala was founded in 2002 by Pam Evans MBE, former Head of the Department of Religious Studies at Coedcae Comprehensive School in Llanelli, Carmarthenshire, Wales. The idea arose from class discussions about the contribution of the "9/11" attacks in New York to Islamophobia, racism, religious intolerance and fundamentalism worldwide, as well as local effects exemplified by the experience of the student Imran Sheikh: "I suffered from racist taunts and our local mosque was attacked following September 11 and that is when the Peace Mala all started". In 2005 Evans gave up her position as Head of Department at Coedcae School to focus on her work with Peace Mala. On 16 November 2006, (25th Shawwal 1427 AH), Evans was awarded the Noble Soul Award 2006 in recognition of her outstanding contribution to challenging Islamophobia in schools. The award was presented by RAHMA (Racial Attacks and Harassment Monitoring Association) on the International Day of Peace.

=== Launch ===
Peace Mala was officially launched in the UNA Temple of Peace in Cardiff on 27 November 2002 by Archbishop of Wales Rowan Williams (later Archbishop of Canterbury). He was joined by members of the fourteen faiths represented on the Peace Mala bracelet, whose procession opened the ceremony, along with NGOs, students and teachers of schools from across Wales, lecturers from the University of Wales, and pupils and staff of Coedcae Comprehensive School.

=== Awards ===
Through the promotion of peace, tolerance and respect, Peace Mala has received numerous awards for their work, notably The Prince's Trust Millennium Award in 2003, the Co-op Community Dividend Award in 2003, the ChildLine Cymru CHIPS Friendship and Respect Award in 2003 (1st Prize), and the Carmarthenshire Police Community Challenge Award in 2004. In 2004, Peace Mala was also awarded first prize in the CEWC-Cymru "Right-On" national competition to promote human rights in Welsh schools. In 2006, Peace Mala received a grant from Awards for All (Wales) in support of the Peace Mala Awards for Youth. In 2007, Peace Mala was awarded the Community Development Foundation Award. It was awarded the Unboxed Award for "excellence in positive activities for young people that maximize youth participation, empowerment and potential", and was presented by the City of London Parochial Foundation in 2008. The Corus Community Award from Tata Steel was awarded to Peace Mala in 2009 and 2010.

== Charitable status ==
On 21 February 2007, Peace Mala, already a company limited by guarantee and not having a share capital, was entered in the Central Register of Charities as Registered Charity No. 1118053.

== Patrons ==
Rowan Williams, Archbishop of Canterbury, was patron of Peace Mala from 2003 until 2008, and was succeeded by Lama Khemsar Rinpoche, Spiritual Director of the Yundrung Bön Study Centre.

=== Rowan Williams ===
Williams and Evans first met when he visited Coedcae School to give talks to the pupils about his work as Archbishop of Wales, a position now held by Barry Morgan. Williams was one of the first people to be contacted by Evans when she came up with the idea of the Peace Mala. One of Williams's final acts as Archbishop of Wales was to join 14 other religious dignitaries in the launch of the Peace Mala in November 2002.

In 2003 Evans invited Williams to be a patron; he held the position until 2008.

=== Lama Khemsar Rinpoche ===
Lama Khemsar Rinpoche also visited Coedcae School prior to his involvement with Peace Mala. Rinpoche left Tibet in 1959, and is the first resident Lama of the Yungdrung Bön tradition in Europe. He also teaches widely in the US.

Evans invited Lama Khemsar Rinpoche to be a patron of the organisation, and he accepted.

== Peace Mala bracelet ==
A Peace Mala is a symbolic bracelet used to promote the message of the Golden Rule of mutual respect recognised by many spiritual paths. It consists of 16 beads, forming a double rainbow, which represent Christianity, Buddhism, Sikhism, Islam, Judaism, Baháʼí, ISKCON (a sect of Hinduism), Zoroastrianism, Tribal and Native Religions, Jainism, Earth religions, Taoism, Hinduism and Yungdrung Bön. The central iridescent clear crystal bead is intended to represent the wearer and whatever path they follow; it also represents the cosmos, emphasising the "interconnectedness of everyone and everything". There are two knots on the elastic thread: one symbolising the wearer's uniqueness and the other intended as a reminder that how people behave affects others. The final crystal bead represents unity, harmony, and peace.

== Registered office ==
On 18 August 2004, the Peace Mala Registered Office was officially opened during a ceremony attended by the Lord Mayor and Consort of the City of Swansea. The office is used as a base for Peace Mala activities, including workshops and public talks.

Attached to the office is a peace garden which contains a shrine to Saint Francis of Assisi, Buddhist statues and prayer flags, a miniature Zen-style stone garden and water features. It also contains a tree area which has been blessed in a ceremony led by Witches, and Druids. There is also a tranquil area facing Mecca, which is dedicated to the Muslim faith.

== Aims ==
Peace Mala outlined its "main aims" as:

- Education for global citizenship through the promotion of understanding, respect, friendship, tolerance and peace between all communities, cultures and enlightened, compassionate faiths.
- Peace Mala supports human rights, confronts bullying and all forms of prejudice.
- Peace Mala raises awareness of issues of global interdependence and encourages active compassion by learners that will effect positive changes locally and globally.

=== International Awards for Youth ===
In 2006, Peace Mala launched the Peace Mala Awards for Youth. The awards and competition encourage young people "... to become aware of and involved with issues of peace, justice, tolerance and friendship.". The competition focuses in issues of equality, human rights and global citizenship.

The Youth Awards allows entrants from educational institutions, youth groups and faith groups. Two prizes are awarded: one for juniors (5–11) and the other for seniors (12–18). The awards were accompanied by cash prizes, and occasionally donated gifts such as commemorative framed posters signed by Gary Marlon Suson from the Ground Zero Museum Workshop.

In 2007, the Peace Mala Awards for Youth became an international competition with youth groups in the USA taking part in the project. In 2009, the awards were superseded by the Peace Mala Accreditation.

=== Accreditation for Schools, Youth Groups and Community Groups ===
In September 2009, Peace Mala celebrated the last Youth Awards ceremony, where the Awards were replaced an accreditation for schools, youth groups and community groups. As the Awards had focused on competitive engagement by schools and some youth groups, the accreditation would be more cooperative and inclusive. Schools and groups are encouraged to include the vision and objectives of Peace Mala within their ethos via the seven criteria and accreditation is awarded when the seven criteria have been successfully fulfilled as outlined in the self-assessment form available to applicants. These seven areas are intended to fit into the school, youth group or community group's values system and are in line with the objectives and vision of Peace Mala.

Applicants for accreditation are judged against seven key criteria:

1. Community cohesion and global citizenship
2. Needs and human rights
3. Interdependence
4. Active compassion
5. Celebrating diversity
6. Environmental responsibilities and sustainable change
7. Conflict resolution and peace education

== Interfaith engagement ==
Along with education and youth engagement, with the religious nature of its founding, Peace Mala engages regularly with interfaith and diversity engagement and occasions. Awareness events and fundraisers are regular occurrences.

=== Pilgrimages ===
Pilgrimages have been used by Peace Mala as a means of promotion, but also as a means to engage communities in interfaith involvement and raise awareness of local areas of interest and community diversity.

==== Gower ====
In May 2011, volunteers discovered a route map which may have been a pilgrimage path linking the Celtic churches of the Gower Peninsula, as well as pre-Christian sites such as holy wells and cromlech stones. A pilgrimage was organised, therefore, the next year to celebrate Peace Mala's first decennial year. The pilgrimage included one pilgrim who was joined at different legs of the pilgrimage culminating in a ceremony at St. Rhidian's Church in Llanrhidian. For the pilgrimage, Pam Evans travelled to Kildare to receive the flame of Brigid of the Brigidine Sisters of the Solas Bhríde hermitage; she then received the World Peace Flame at the Dru International Training Centre for Education and Wellbeing in Snowdonia National Park; finally, various faith representatives attended a ceremony where a flame was blessed at the shrine of St David at St David's Cathedral by The Very Revd Jonathan Lean. These three flames were used during the start of the pilgrimage, where the lights were blessed by The Rt Revd John Davies, Bishop of Swansea and Brecon; as well as at the end, where the flames were blessed by numerous faith representatives including Muslim, Druid and Buddhists, as well as ISKCON sannyasa who greeted the pilgrims with kirtan.

At each of the sites visited, the main pilgrim lit votive candles and recited a prayer composed for the pilgrimage. She was joined on various days by school children as well as fellow pilgrims.

==== Llangyfelach "Forgotten" Monastery ====
On 9 May 2013, Ascension Day, Peace Mala led a one-day pilgrimage as a means of a revival of a postulated pilgrimage route to a now-defunct early Celtic monastery founded by St David on the site of the current parish Church of St David and St Cyfelach in Llangyfelach.

The participants in the pilgrimage included pupils from St John Lloyd Catholic School in Llanelli, Hafod Primary School in Swansea and Catwg Primary School. Also in procession were dignitaries from numerous faith, including The Rt Rev'd John Davies, Bishop of Swansea and Brecon, as well as representatives from the Brahma Kumaris World Spiritual University, the Catholic Church, Anglican Communion and Kagyu Tibetan Buddhism among many others.

==== Travelling Doves of Peace ====
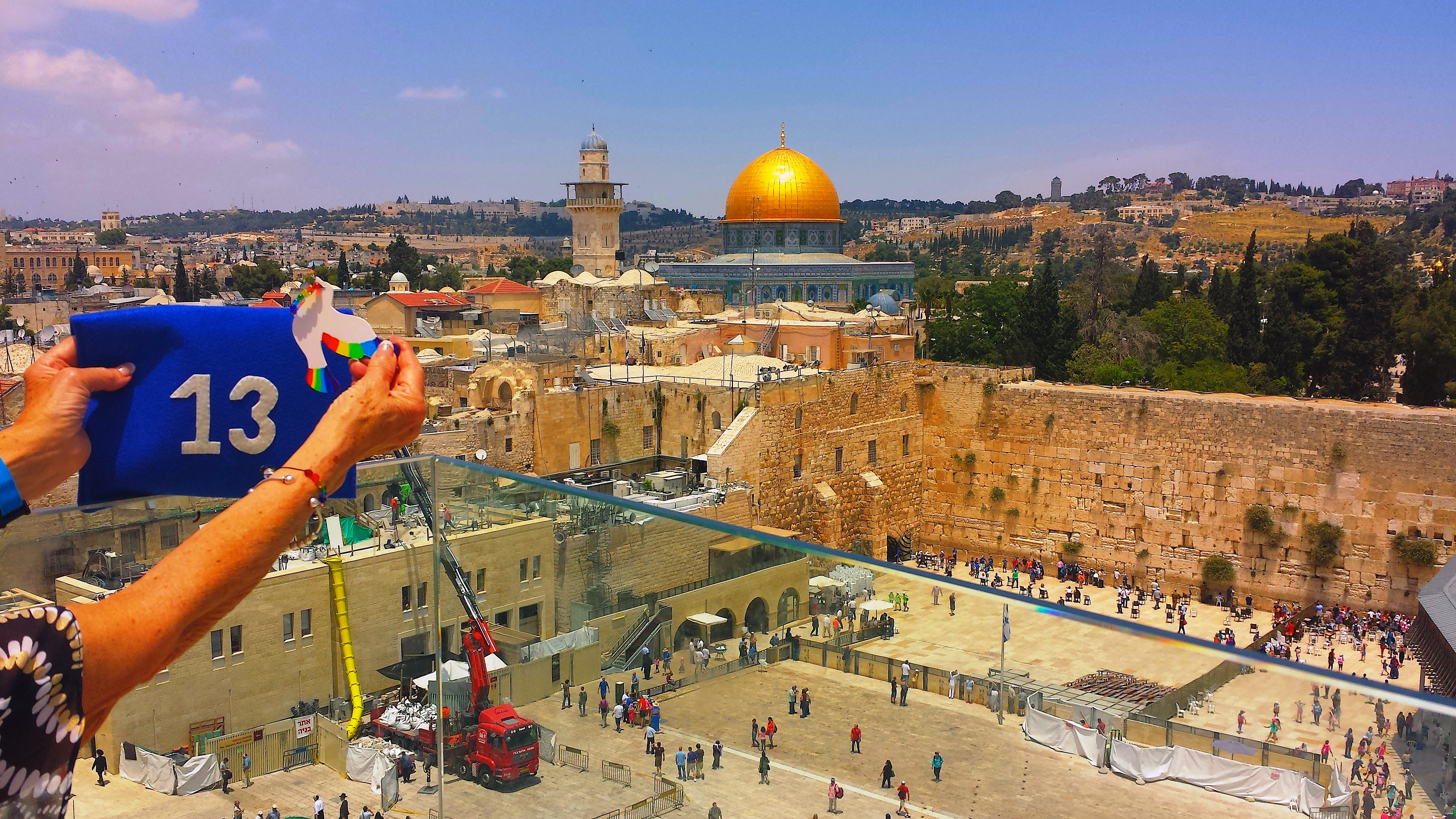
Dove 13 in Jerusalem

Peace Mala released 14 small symbolic doves made from wood painted in the Peace Mala colours and each carrying a Peace Mala bracelet (along with other items) during a ceremony that took place in the Peace Mala peace garden on 30 April 2015. The Deputy Lord Mayor of the City and County of Swansea, the Mayor and Mayoress of Neath Port Talbot, Regional Chief of Police, Bishop Tom Burns of Menevia, representatives of several faith communities and pupils and teachers from some of Peace Mala Accredited schools were all in attendance. The founder aims that as the Doves of Peace (also known as 'Peace Doves') travel the UK and across the world, they will raise awareness of the work of Peace Mala with schools, youth groups and community groups. Within the first few months after the launch, three of the doves travelled to the US, Ireland, Holland, Italy, Cyprus, Israel, Africa, Hong Kong and Japan. The journeys of the 14 doves were tracked to provide a geography project for schools and youth groups.

=== Recognising Achievement for Service to Wales ===
On 10 June 2010 the founder of Peace Mala was honoured with the Recognising Achievement for Service to Wales. This award was first introduced by the Welsh Assembly Government in 2009. The 2010 Award for Promoting Tolerance was carefully selected to mark the 65th anniversary of the end of World War II and the liberation of the death camps in Auschwitz and elsewhere. Evans received this honour from the First Minister Carwyn Jones AM in recognition of her work with Peace Mala and her positive stand against all forms of inequality and intolerance.

Peace Mala units at Primary and Secondary level included in the new Religious Education Agreed Syllabus for Trafford Education Authority UK

On 9 February 2011, the founder was invited to take part in a full day of meetings with Trafford Education Authority to discuss the inclusion of Peace Mala units at primary and secondary levels for the new RE Agreed Syllabus. This proved highly successful with ideas being shared between teachers and RE advisors, including Steve Illingworth (Independent Educational Consultant and Education Link Officer to Salford SACRE) and Erica Pounce, School Improvement Partner and Link Advisor for Primary Education. Pounce reported that they had worked collaboratively with other Greater Manchester SACREs but had also developed a distinctive local flavour, which is where the Peace Mala Units would sit as an optional unit and as an example of a compelling learning experience. The New RE syllabus for Trafford Education Authority, including units on Peace Mala, was launched on 24 March 2011.

=== Queen's Birthday Honours ===
In the Queen's Birthday Honours for 2019, Pam Evans, founder of Peace Mala, received an MBE for services to the promotion of peace and interfaith understanding.

=== International Interfaith Liturgy for World Peace, Llandaff 2017 ===
In July 2017, the Peace Mala International Interfaith Liturgy for World Peace took place at Llandaff Cathedral, Wales. This event took almost two years to organise and plan. Representatives from sixteen religions, including three Christian Bishops, and supporters from across the UK and elsewhere attended and took part. These included dignitaries from Cardiff, Swansea, Neath Port Talbot and Greater Manchester and Peace Mala schools from Wales, Greater Manchester and Yorkshire. The cathedral was filled to capacity and was the largest interfaith gathering for world peace that Wales had hosted.

=== Apostolic Blessing for Peace Mala from Pope Francis, September 2017 ===
On 21 September 2017, Peace Mala celebrated the UN International Day of Peace at St Joseph's Catholic Cathedral in Swansea, Wales. Seven schools took part in the Peace Mala Youth Liturgy for World Peace. Peace Mala schools that could not be present at the event sang the Peace Mala Anthem, 'One Light' in their school assemblies across the UK. At the final prayer and blessing from Bishop Tom, the congregation heard an Apostolic Blessing from Pope Francis which read: "His Holiness Pope Francis presents his good wishes to Pam Evans and to all those persons involved in Peace Mala and imparts to them the requested Apostolic Blessing upon their work for world peace and encourages them with his prayers".

=== International Interfaith Liturgy For World Peace, Brecon Cathedral September 2019 ===
On 16 September 2019, Peace Mala celebrated the UN International Day of Peace at Brecon Cathedral in South Wales. Peace Mala schools from Wales and Greater Manchester were present at the event, as were dignitaries from South Wales and Powys. Faith representatives came to Brecon from elsewhere in the UK. The event also linked up with One Day One Choir, with schoolchildren attending the event singing the Peace Mala anthem 'One Light' with West End singer and supporter of Peace Mala, Steve Balsamo, and Peace Mala's Director of Music, Lee Michael Walton. Dance also played a part in the event, with a Native American Hoop Dance being performed.

=== World Peace Mala Festival, St David's, Pembrokeshire, June 17th-19th 2020 ===
To coincide with the 900th anniversary of St David's canonisation, Peace Mala was invited by the Diocese of St David to take our interfaith World Peace Ceremony to the cathedral in 2020. Sadly this event was cancelled due to the COVID pandemic.
