= Thomas Halliwell =

British priest and academic (1900–1982)

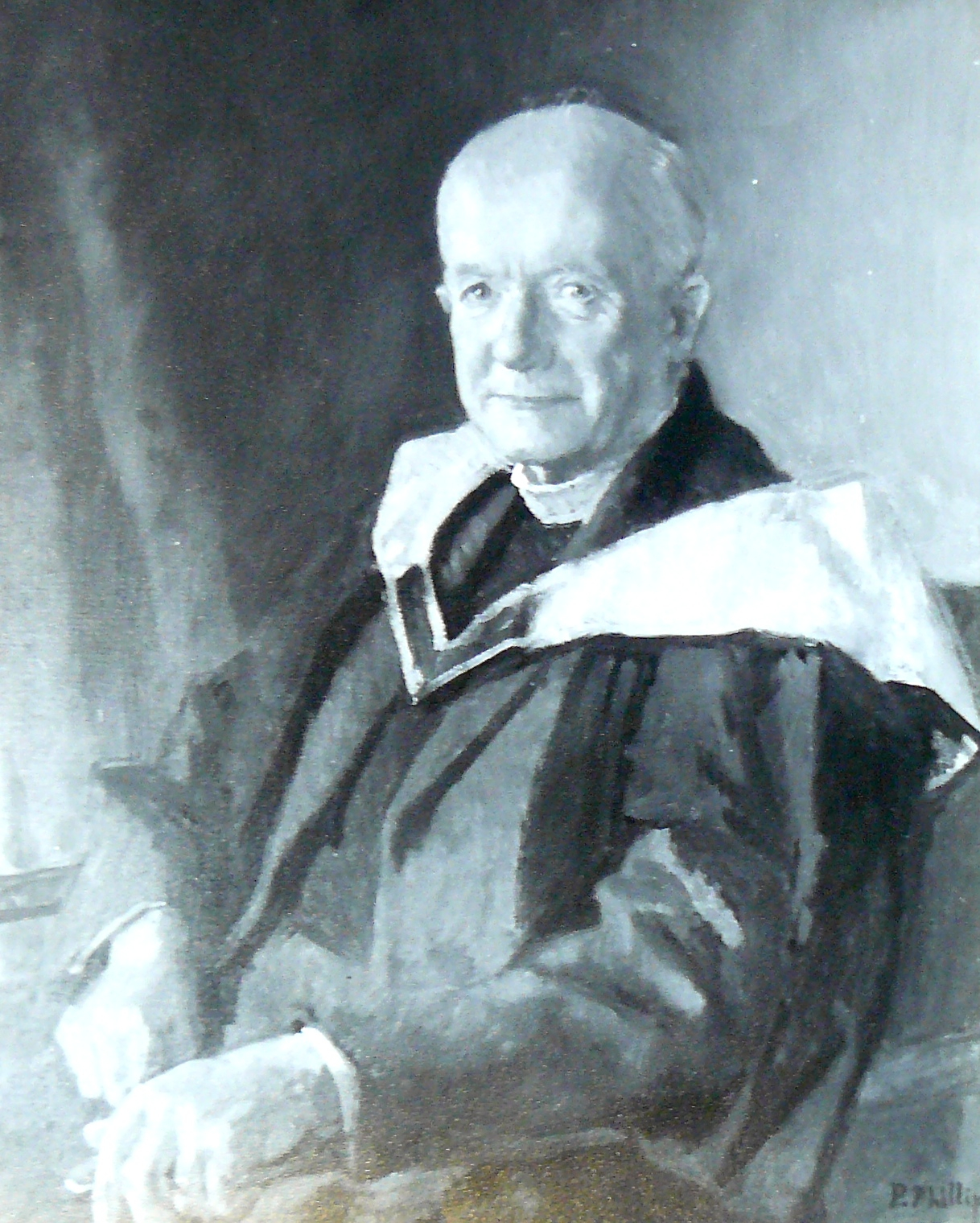
- A portrait of Thomas Halliwell
- Born: 27 January 1900; Wigan, England
- Died: 1 December 1982 (aged 82)
- Education: Manchester University (B.A.)
- Religion: Anglicanism

Thomas Halliwell (27 January 1900 – 1 December 1982) was the principal of Trinity College Carmarthen (now the University of Wales Trinity St David) in the middle part of the 20th century.

== Early life and education ==
Thomas Halliwell was born in Wigan in 1900, the only child of John Halliwell, a noted Lancashire cricketer, and his wife Annie (née Carter) whose father was company secretary to Pearson and Knowles. Educated at Wigan Wesleyan Methodist School and Wigan Grammar School, Halliwell left school at age 15 to work in the Midland Bank.

== War service ==
In 1918, and before his call-up, he had joined the merchant marine as a Marconi wireless operator aboard HMT Poleric (see RMS Albania). He described his experiences during World War I in his 1918 journal A Memorable Year, which is lodged in the Roderic Bowen Archive at the University of Wales Trinity Saint David.

== Academic and clerical career ==
Following service in the merchant marine during WWI, and after a period of voluntary teaching, he entered Manchester University in 1920, graduating in 1923 with honours in English. He also gained a first class teaching diploma in 1924. Later, in 1944, his thesis on the Oxford Movement resulted in the award of a master's degree by Manchester University. In 1924, in order to study for the priesthood, he went to Ridley Hall in Cambridge. Halliwell was ordained deacon in 1925 by the Bishop of Birmingham, and then served in Aston Parish, Birmingham, before becoming tutor and chaplain at Trinity College Carmarthen from 1927 until 1931 when he returned to parish work in Lancashire. He was first appointed vicar of St George's Church, Wigan, where he raised the funds necessary to undertake the complete re-modelling of the Old Church of St George's. In 1936, he became vicar of St Peter's Church in Chorley before returning to Carmarthen in 1940 as principal of Trinity College.

Trinity College became Trinity University College in 2009 and is now part of the University of Wales Trinity Saint David. Lord Gordon Parry of Neyland, writing in his memoirs of his time as a student at Trinity between 1943 and 1945, described Halliwell as: "kindly... intellectually alert and still studying".

Halliwell ran the college during the Second World War and its temporary union with King Alfred's College, Winchester. Through the fifties and early sixties he instigated the extensive expansion at Trinity College, and personally supervised the raising of half the cost of the building works for that growth. In 1957 Princess Margaret opened the new Women's Hostel Neuadd Non, and in her speech acknowledged the debt Trinity owed to his work. Further expansion followed and in July 1963, Lady Marion Philipps opened further new hostels and the Theatre Complex which is now known as the Halliwell Centre.

Halliwell was appointed Canon of Llangan of St David's Cathedral in 1946, and Canon of Llandysilio-gogo and canon treasurer of St Davids Cathedral from 1956.

== Awards and honours ==
Following his retirement in 1965, he was honoured by the University of Wales on 16 July 1966 with a Doctorate of Laws in recognition of his services to education in Wales. In 1966, Halliwell was also presented with a very fine portrait (above) by Patrick Edward Phillips, which was exhibited at the 73rd Annual Exhibition of the Royal Society of Portrait Painters. The portrait may be seen in the Archbishop Childs' Hall at the University of Wales Trinity Saint David's Carmarthen campus. The Theatre and Arts complex at Trinity was renamed 'The Halliwell Centre', in Halliwell's honour, by former principal Clive Jones Davies.

Halliwell's services to education in Wales, and to the wider community, were further recognized when, on Maundy Thursday 1982, he became a recipient of the Maundy Money, from Her Majesty Queen Elizabeth, at the Maundy Service held at St Davids Cathedral, the first time such a service was held in Wales.
