= John Owen (author) =

Welsh author and director

- Born: John Arwyn Owen; 1952; Wales, United Kingdom
- Died: September/October 2001 (aged 49); Porthcawl, Bridgend County Borough, Wales
- Cause of death: Suicide by drug overdose
- Occupations: Teacher, author, playwright, director
- Notable work: Pam Fi Duw

John Arwyn Owen (1952–2001) was a children's author and director and is best known for his Welsh teen television drama Pam fi Duw (Why me God), a series of books and TV programmes which he wrote and directed. In 1995, 1997 and 1999 he won the Tir na n-Og Award for the best Welsh Language fiction book for Children.

Owen was a former Drama teacher and Head of Lower school at Ysgol Gyfun Rhydfelen near Pontypridd, South Wales. He was arrested for five serious sex offences in 2001 after four former pupils came forward. He killed himself before facing trial.

== Education ==
John Owen was a former pupil and prefect at Ysgol Gyfun Rhydfelen. He completed his Bachelor of Education degree in 1974 at Trinity College in Carmarthen; in the same year he took up his first teaching appointment at his former secondary school.

== Child sexual abuse ==
In September 2001, John Owen was arrested and charged with serious criminal offences against children at Ysgol Gyfun Rhydfelen. On 4 October 2001 John Owen was found dead at his caravan in Porthcawl, having failed to appear in court. He was determined to have killed himself with an overdose of morphine.

Many believed that the reason why John Owen got away with the serious acts for so long and continue to perpetrate was because the school was hiding the truth (not giving all the evidence to police), to stop the public losing confidence in Welsh-medium education.

Later an inquiry was launched by the Children's Commissioner Peter Clarke called the "Clywch Report", which also listed the major list of allegations against John Owen, and gave recommendations that should be implemented to stop something similar happening again. Clarke said in the report "No-one who heard the evidence I have heard in my Inquiry could, in good faith, harbour any doubts that Mr John Owen was guilty of serious acts of sexual impropriety against some pupils at Ysgol Gyfun Rhydfelen."

In April 2021 a former pupil of John Owen, Gareth Potter, came forward to speak publicly in a S4C documentary, Cadw Cyfrinach (Keeping a Secret). He and two others who worked with John Owen on the Pam fi Duw series shared their experience of being groomed and seeing other boys being groomed and sexually exploited.
