= Dru yoga =

Dru yoga is a style of yoga that works with postures, breath work, relaxation and meditation. Its series or sequences are called Energy Block Release. According to "Dru World Wide" this yoga style has thousands of practitioners in 31 countries.
The word Dru in the name refers to Dhruva, a prince in Hindu mythology whom the god Vishnu honored with the eternal abode on the Pole Star. Dru can also be translated from Sanskrit as 'pole star' and represents our 'inner still-point'.

Dru Yoga aims to create healing and unity by combining Asanas, Pranayama (breath control) and the ancient Eastern tradition of Mudras (hand gestures). There are a number of books published about Dru Yoga.

== History ==
Dru was started in 1978 by Mansukh Patel, Chris Barrington, Rita Goswami, Annie Jones and John Jones at Bangor University. It is inspired by the teachings of Francis of Assisi and Mahatma Gandhi.

With their head office in Nant Ffrancon in a former motel, near Bethesda, Gwynedd Dru Worldwide and affiliates have registered Dru yoga as their trademark in Australia and the US. The organisation changed its name from Life Foundation School of Therapeutics Ltd to the World Peace Flame Foundation, and has also been known as Life Foundation International, Dru (UK) Ltd and Dru World Wide.

== Criticism ==
The Sunday Mail reported in 2001 that of funds raised only a fraction went to charity. In 2006 ex-members of the organization came forward with allegations of sexual exploitation and abuse within the organization. Other efforts by the Life Foundation were criticized, such as the Eternal Peace Flame.

The Dutch web directory SIMPOS was at one time collating articles in English, critical of the organisation and its former leader Mansukh Patel, who has since returned to the top of the leadership team.

== Bibliography ==
- Barrington, Chris (2005). Dru Yoga : stillness in motion. Nant Ffrancon, Bethesda, North Wales, U.K: DRU Publications. ISBN 978-1-873606-25-4. OCLC 224680849.
