= HD 120084 =

Star in the constellation Ursa Minor

- Location of HD 120084 (circled in red)

Observation data Epoch J2000.0 Equinox ICRS
- Constellation: Ursa Minor
- Right ascension: 13^{h} 42^{m} 39.20162^{s}
- Declination: +78° 03′ 51.9800″
- Apparent magnitude (V): 5.91

Characteristics
- Evolutionary stage: Red clump
- Spectral type: G7III
- B−V color index: 1.000

Astrometry
Radial velocity (R_{v})	−8.97±0.13 km/s
Proper motion (μ)	RA: −64.900(31) mas/yr Dec.: 46.164(33) mas/yr
Parallax (π)	9.6277±0.0258 mas
Distance	338.8 ± 0.9 ly (103.9 ± 0.3 pc)
Absolute magnitude (M_{V})	+0.96

Details
Mass	2.661±0.335 M_{☉}
Radius	11.03±0.65 R_{☉}
Luminosity	63+8 −7 L_{☉}
Surface gravity (log g)	2.779±0.075 cgs
Temperature	4,969±40 K
Metallicity [Fe/H]	0.12±0.03 dex
Rotational velocity (v sin i)	2.44 km/s

Other designations
- BD+78°466, FK5 3090, HIP 66903, SAO 7876

Database references
SIMBAD	data
Exoplanet Archive	data

HD 120084 is a star with an orbiting exoplanet in the northern constellation of Ursa Minor. With an apparent magnitude of 5.91, it is just visible to the naked eye in suburban skies. The distance to this system is 339 light-years based on parallax measurements, but it is drifting closer to the Sun with a radial velocity of −9 km/s.

The spectrum of this star matches a type of G7III, indicating it is a G-type giant, an evolved star that used up its hydrogen fuel and has expanded. After undergoing a helium flash, it is now in the red clump stage generating energy through the fusion of helium. It has 2.7 times the mass of the Sun and a radius about 11 times the radius of the Sun. It radiates 60 times the Sun's luminosity from its photosphere at an effective temperature of around 4,969 K.

== Planetary system ==
A gas giant planet was discovered in 2013 using Doppler spectroscopy, named HD 120084 b. This planet has one of the most eccentric orbits discovered around an evolved star, with published estimates of the eccentricity ranging from 0.48 to 0.73. In 2022, the inclination and true mass of HD 120084 b were measured via astrometry, with two more astrometric orbital solutions published in 2023.

The HD 120084 planetary system
Companion (in order from star)	Mass	Semimajor axis (AU)	Orbital period (years)	Eccentricity	Inclination (°)	Radius
b	6.4+2.9 −1.9 M_{J}	4.21+0.17 −0.19	5.864+0.024 −0.026	0.483+0.027 −0.029	38+22 −12 or 139+15 −29	—
