= Pi1 Ursae Minoris =

Common proper motion binary star in the constellation Ursa Minor

π^{1} Ursae Minoris
Observation data Epoch J2000.0 Equinox ICRS
- Constellation: Ursa Minor
- π^{1} UMi A
- Right ascension: 15^{h} 29^{m} 11.18410^{s}
- Declination: +80° 26′ 54.9673″
- Apparent magnitude (V): +6.58
- π^{1} UMi B
- Right ascension: 15^{h} 29^{m} 23.59182^{s}
- Declination: +80° 27′ 00.9654″
- Apparent magnitude (V): +7.31

Characteristics

π^{1} UMi A
- Evolutionary stage: main sequence
- Spectral type: G1.5 V(n)
- U−B color index: +0.13
- B−V color index: +0.67

π^{1} UMi B
- Evolutionary stage: main sequence
- Spectral type: G9 V
- U−B color index: +0.37
- B−V color index: +0.79

Astrometry

π^{1} UMi A
Radial velocity (R_{v})	−16.27±0.09 km/s
Proper motion (μ)	RA: −225.796 mas/yr Dec.: +107.613 mas/yr
Parallax (π)	45.8428±0.0203 mas
Distance	71.15 ± 0.03 ly (21.814 ± 0.010 pc)
Absolute magnitude (M_{V})	4.94±0.04

π^{1} UMi B
Radial velocity (R_{v})	−15.40±0.70 km/s
Proper motion (μ)	RA: −217.596 mas/yr Dec.: +105.986 mas/yr
Parallax (π)	45.8939±0.0163 mas
Distance	71.07 ± 0.03 ly (21.789 ± 0.008 pc)

Details

π^{1} UMi A
Mass	1.02 M_{☉}
Radius	0.96 R_{☉}
Luminosity	0.92 L_{☉}
Surface gravity (log g)	4.49 cgs
Temperature	5,771 K
Metallicity [Fe/H]	+0.22 dex
Rotation	4.23 days
Rotational velocity (v sin i)	4.81 km/s
Age	9.22±3.84 Gyr

π^{1} UMi B
Mass	0.92 M_{☉}
Radius	0.84 R_{☉}
Luminosity	0.52 L_{☉}
Surface gravity (log g)	4.55 cgs
Temperature	5,330 K
Metallicity [Fe/H]	+0.01 dex
Rotation	8 days
Rotational velocity (v sin i)	5.06 km/s
Age	7.4 Gyr

Other designations
- π^{1} UMi, ADS 9696, WDS J15292+8027
- π^{1} UMi A: BD+80°480, HD 139777, HIP 75809, HR 5829, SAO 2556
- π^{1} UMi B: BD+80°481, HD 139813, HIP 75829, SAO 2558

Database references
SIMBAD	π^{1} UMi AB
- π^{1} UMi A
- π^{1} UMi B

Pi^{1} Ursae Minoris is a common proper motion binary star system in the northern circumpolar constellation of Ursa Minor. The pair have apparent visual magnitudes of +6.58 and +7.31, with a combined magnitude of 6.1. They are located about 71 light years from the Sun. The two have an angular separation of 31.4 arc seconds, which corresponds to a physical separation of about 680 AU, and orbit each other with a period of about 13,100 years.

Both stars are solar analogs and have been listed as possible members of the Hercules-Lyra association, one of the nearest moving groups to the Sun, although this is now considered unlikely. The primary, π^{1} Ursae Minoris A, has a mass 2% higher than the sun, an almost identical effective temperature at 5,771 K, a radius 98% of the sun's, and a bolometric luminosity 93% of the sun's. The secondary, π^{1} Ursae Minoris B, has a mass 92% of the sun's, a slightly lower temperature of 5,408 K, a radius 84% of the sun's, and a luminosity slightly over half of the sun.
