= Dhruva =

Ascetic devotee of the Hindu god Vishnu

- Polaris
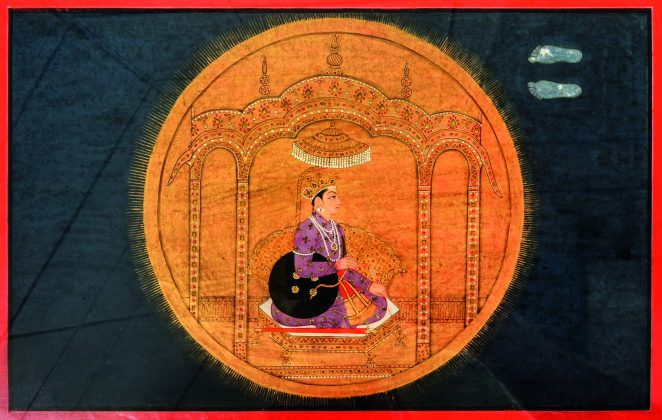
- Dhruva as the Pole star, a Pahari painting by Manaku c. 1740
- Devanagari: ध्रुव
- Affiliation: Devotee of Vishnu
- Abode: Dhruvaloka in outer space

Genealogy
- Parents: Uttānapāda and Suniti
- Spouse: Brāhmī and Ilā
- Children: Kalpa and Vatsara (from Brāhmī); Utkala (from Ilā)

Dhruva (Sanskrit: ध्रुव, IAST: Dhruva, lit. "unshakeable, immovable, fixed or eternal") was an ascetic devotee of Vishnu mentioned in the Vishnu Purana and the Bhagavata Purana.

The Sanskrit term dhruva nakshatra (ध्रुव नक्षत्र, "polar star") has been used for Pole Star in the Mahabharata, personified as son of Uttānapāda and grandson of Manu, even though Polaris at the likely period of the recension of the text of the Mahabharata was still several degrees away from the celestial pole.

== Narrative ==
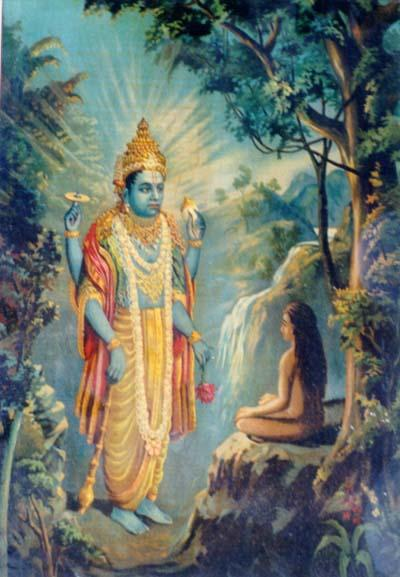
Vishnu appears before Dhruva – A painting by Raja Ravi Varma.

=== Devotion towards Vishnu ===
Dhruva was born as son of the King Uttānapāda (the son of Svayambhuva Manu) and his wife Suniti. The king also had another son Uttama, born to his second queen Suruchi, who was the preferred object of his affection. Once, when Dhruva was five years old, he saw his younger brother, Uttama sitting on his father's lap at the King's throne. Suruchi, who was jealous of Dhruva (since he would be heir to the throne, and not Suruchi's son), cruelly scolded young Dhruva for his efforts to sit on his father's lap. When Dhruva protested and asked if he could be allowed to sit on his father's lap, Suruchi berated him saying, 'Go ask god to be born in my womb. Only then will you have the privilege'. Suniti - being of gentle nature and now the lesser favorite wife - tried to console the distraught child, but Dhruva was determined to hear of his fate from the Lord himself and set out to perform austerities in the forest. Noticing his resolve, the divine sage Narada appeared before him and tried to desist him from assuming a severe austerity upon himself at such an early age. But, Dhruva was determined and the sage guided him by teaching him the rituals and mantras to meditate on when seeking lord Vishnu. The one mantra which Narada taught and which was effectively used by Dhruva was Om Namo Bhagavate Vasudevaya. Having been advised, Dhruva started his meditation, and went without food and water for six months. Vishnu was pleased and appeared before Dhruva. Dhruva sang a poem praising Vishnu in 12 powerful verses, also known as Dhruva-stuti.

Vishnu Purana gives a slightly different account here. When Vishnu was pleased with Dhruva's tapasya (penance) and asked him for a varadāna (grant of wishes), he asked for the varadāna of knowledge of a stuti (hymn). Other persons would have asked for worldly or heavenly pleasures, or for moksha at most, but Dhruva had no personal desire. Renunciation of all desires is regarded to be essential for eternal peace in Hinduism: this is the meaning of Dhruva-pada. That was the reason why the Saptarshis decided to give Dhruva the most revered seat of a star - the Pole Star.

Having spent a long time in Vishnu's remembrance he even forgot the objective of his tapasya, and only asked for a life in memory of Vishnu. Pleased by his tapasya, Vishnu granted his wish and further decreed that he would attain Dhruva-pada: the state where he would become a celestial body which would not even be touched by the Maha Pralaya.

Dhruva returned to his kingdom, to be warmly received by his family, and attained the crown at the age of six. He ruled for many decades in a fair and just manner.

=== The Yaksha War ===
According to the Srimad Bhagavata, once, Dhruva's step-brother Uttama went to the foothills of the Himalayas to hunt. However, Uttama was killed by a Yaksha. Uttama's mother Suruchi went looking for him, but she too was killed.

This news reached Dhruva. He was enraged and so, he declared a war against the Yakshas. He travelled to the Yaksha kingdom of Alakapuri fought valiantly, and vanquished his opponents. After defeating the Yaksha soldiers, he began killing even innocent Yakshas. Alarmed by this, Dhruva's grandfather, Svayambhuva Manu appeared before him and bade him to stop. He calmed Dhruva's anger down.

After realising his mistake, Dhruva apologised to the Yaksha king, Vaishravana. Vaishravana asked Dhruva for a boon, and Dhruva asked for being able to preserve his devotion towards Vishnu when Uttama came back to life.

== See also ==
- Nachiketa
- Saptarshi
- Dru yoga
- Myōken
- Prahlada
- Dhruvsatya
