= HD 133002 =

Possible binary star in the constellation Ursa Minor

Observation data Epoch J2000.0 Equinox J2000.0
- Constellation: Ursa Minor
- Right ascension: 14^{h} 50^{m} 20.421^{s}
- Declination: +82° 30′ 42.99″
- Apparent magnitude (V): 5.63

Characteristics
- Evolutionary stage: subgiant
- Spectral type: G2V
- U−B color index: +0.17
- B−V color index: +0.671±0.004

Astrometry
Radial velocity (R_{v})	−44.38 km/s
Proper motion (μ)	RA: +177.593 mas/yr Dec.: −224.260 mas/yr
Parallax (π)	22.9030±0.0496 mas
Distance	142.4 ± 0.3 ly (43.66 ± 0.09 pc)
Absolute magnitude (M_{V})	2.448

Details

HD 133002 A
Mass	1.51 M_{☉}
Radius	3.4 R_{☉}
Luminosity	9.54±0.04 L_{☉}
Surface gravity (log g)	3.86 cgs
Temperature	5,515±1 K
Metallicity [Fe/H]	−0.41 dex
Rotational velocity (v sin i)	5.2 km/s
Age	2.80 Gyr

HD 133002 B
Mass	0.15±0.01 M_{☉}

Other designations
- BD+83°431, FK5 1644, GJ 3876, HD 133002, HIP 72573, HR 5596, SAO 2459

Database references
SIMBAD	data
ARICNS	data

HD 133002 (HR 5596) is a possible binary star in the northern constellation of Ursa Minor. With an apparent visual magnitude of 5.65, it is faintly visible to the naked eye. (According to the Bortle scale, it can be viewed from dark rural skies.) The high declination of +82.5° means it is hidden from view from most of the southern hemisphere. Parallax measurements yield an estimated distance of around 142 light years from the Sun. If it was instead positioned at a distance of 33 ly (10 pc), this would be a second magnitude star. The system is drifting closer with a heliocentric radial velocity of −44 km/s.

This is a G-type main sequence star with a stellar classification of G2V, although it has also been classified as F9V or G0V. With spectral absorption lines of metals and absorption bands of some molecules weaker than expected based on its hydrogen lines, it is defined as a weak line star. Based on its G-band strengths, it would we given a class of G0, and based on its metal lines a class of G1.

It is estimated to have 51% greater mass than the Sun, and is younger with an age of around 2.8 billion years. The projected rotational velocity along the star's equator is a relatively leisurely 5.2 km/s. The star is considered a photometric solar analog, although it is deficient in elements more massive than helium when compared to the Sun. The chemical composition and relatively low surface gravity for a star of its classification suggest that this may instead be a subgiant star that is in the process of evolving away from the main sequence. The effective temperature of the star's photosphere is 5,515 K, giving it the yellow-white hue of a G-type star.

This star has been examined for evidence of an infrared excess, but none was detected. During a 2006−2007 survey of nearby stars, it was discovered that HD 133002 has a low-mass common proper motion stellar companion. This object has an estimated 15% of the Sun's mass. It has a projected separation of around 80 AU from the primary, which suggests an orbital period of roughly 700 years. At present, there is insufficient observational data available to determine orbital elements.
