= 11 Ursae Minoris b =

Extrasolar planet

Discovery
- Discovered by: Döllinger et al.
- Discovery site: TLS
- Discovery date: August 12, 2009
- Detection method: Radial velocity

Orbital characteristics
- Semi-major axis: 1.54 ± 0.07 AU (230,000,000 ± 10,000,000 km)
- Eccentricity: 0.08 ± 0.03
- Orbital period (sidereal): 516.22 ± 3.25 d 1.4133 ± 0.0089 y
- Time of periastron: 2452861.05 ± 2.06
- Argument of periastron: 117.63 ± 21.06
- Star: 11 Ursae Minoris

Proper orbital elements
- Proper semi-major axis: 1.54±0.07 AU
- Proper eccentricity: 0.08±0.03

Physical characteristics
- Mass: 11.2±0.2 M_{J}

11 Ursae Minoris b is an extrasolar planet which orbits the K-type giant star 11 Ursae Minoris, located approximately 390 light years away in the constellation Ursa Minor. This planet has a minimum mass of 10.5 M_{J}. Since inclination is not known, the actual mass is unknown. This planet may actually be a brown dwarf if a true mass is over 13 times that of Jupiter. This planet takes 17 months to orbit the star at the average distance of 1.54 AU in a circular orbit. This superjovian planet was detected by radial velocity method on August 12, 2009.
