= 4 Ursae Minoris =

Binary star system in the constellation Ursa Minor

- Location of 4 Ursae Minoris (circled in red)

Observation data Epoch J2000 Equinox ICRS
- Constellation: Ursa Minor
- Right ascension: 14^{h} 08^{m} 50.92654^{s}
- Declination: +77° 32′ 51.0466″
- Apparent magnitude (V): 4.80

Characteristics
- Spectral type: K3-IIIb Fe-0.5
- B−V color index: 1.368

Astrometry
Radial velocity (R_{v})	+5.86±0.10 km/s
Proper motion (μ)	RA: −30.45 mas/yr Dec.: +32.85 mas/yr
Parallax (π)	7.14±0.42 mas
Distance	460 ± 30 ly (140 ± 8 pc)
Absolute magnitude (M_{V})	−1.06

Orbit
Period (P)	605.8 d
Semi-major axis (a)	6.5 mas
Eccentricity (e)	0.137±0.012
Inclination (i)	136.0±5.1°
Longitude of the node (Ω)	325.5±2.8°
Periastron epoch (T)	2,438,901.7±8.5 JD
Argument of periastron (ω) (secondary)	311.8±5.2°
Semi-amplitude (K_{1}) (primary)	12.65±0.16 km/s

Details

4 UMi A
Radius	28 R_{☉}
Luminosity	436.72 L_{☉}
Surface gravity (log g)	1.73±0.45 cgs
Temperature	4,165±48 K
Metallicity [Fe/H]	−0.19±0.11 dex

Other designations
- 4 UMi, BD+78°478, FK5 524, HD 124547, HIP 69112, HR 5321, SAO 7958

Database references
SIMBAD	data

4 Ursae Minoris is a binary star system in the northern circumpolar constellation Ursa Minor. It is faintly visible to the naked eye with an apparent visual magnitude of 4.80. Based upon an annual parallax shift of 7.14±0.42 mas as seen from Earth's orbit, it is located roughly 460 light years from the Sun. It is moving further away with a heliocentric radial velocity of +5.9 km/s.

This is a single-lined spectroscopic binary star system with an orbital period of 1.66 years and an eccentricity of 0.14. The primary is a red giant of spectral type K3-IIIb Fe-0.5, a star that has used up its core hydrogen and is expanding. The suffix notation indicates the spectrum displays a mild underabundance of iron for a star of its type. It has expanded to around 28 times the Sun's radius and is radiating 437 times the Sun's luminosity from its enlarged photosphere at an effective temperature of 4,165 K.

In Chinese astronomy, this star is named Hougong, the imperial concubine or empress. It forms the asterism Beiji (Northern Pole) with γ Ursae Minoris, β Ursae Minoris, 5 Ursae Minoris, and Σ 1694.
