= 5 Ursae Minoris =

Star in the constellation Ursa Minor

- Location of 5 Ursae Minoris (circled in red)

Observation data Epoch J2000 Equinox ICRS
- Constellation: Ursa Minor
- Right ascension: 14^{h} 27^{m} 31.54335^{s}
- Declination: +75° 41′ 45.5717″
- Apparent magnitude (V): 4.253

Characteristics
- Spectral type: K4-III
- B−V color index: 1.457

Astrometry
Radial velocity (R_{v})	+9.34 km/s
Proper motion (μ)	RA: +8.79 mas/yr Dec.: +21.76 mas/yr
Parallax (π)	9.09±0.13 mas
Distance	359 ± 5 ly (110 ± 2 pc)
Absolute magnitude (M_{V})	−0.96

Details
Mass	1.86 M_{☉}
Radius	16 R_{☉}
Luminosity	447 L_{☉}
Surface gravity (log g)	1.91 cgs
Temperature	4,095±39 K
Metallicity [Fe/H]	−0.16 dex
Rotational velocity (v sin i)	1.9 km/s
Age	2.00 Gyr

Other designations
- 5 UMi, NSV 6687, BD+76°527, FK5 1379, HD 127700, HIP 70692, HR 5430, SAO 8024, WDS J14275+7542A

Database references
SIMBAD	data

5 Ursae Minoris is a star in the circumpolar constellation of Ursa Minor. It is a faint star but visible to the naked eye with an apparent visual magnitude of 4.253. The distance to this star, as determined from an annual parallax shift of 9.09±0.13 mas, is about 110 pc. It is moving further away with a heliocentric radial velocity of +9 km/s.

With an age of around two billion years, this is an evolved red giant with a stellar classification of K4-III; a star that has used up its core hydrogen and has expanded. It is a mild barium star, which may indicate it is a binary with a white dwarf companion, and is very lithium-weak. The star has an estimated 1.86 times the mass of the Sun and has expanded to about 16 times the Sun's radius. It is radiating 447 times the Sun's luminosity from its enlarged photosphere at an effective temperature of 4,095 K.

In Chinese astronomy, this star is named Shuzi, the son of a concubine. It forms the asterism Beiji (Northern Pole) with γ Ursae Minoris, β Ursae Minoris, 4 Ursae Minoris, and Σ 1694.
