= Pi2 Ursae Minoris =

Binary star system in the constellation Ursa Minor

Pi^{2} Ursae Minoris
Observation data Epoch J2000 Equinox ICRS
- Constellation: Ursa Minor
- Right ascension: 15^{h} 39^{m} 38.61131^{s}
- Declination: +79° 58′ 59.5495″
- Apparent magnitude (V): 6.89 (7.32 + 8.15)

Characteristics
- Spectral type: F1V + G0
- B−V color index: 0.392±0.015

Astrometry
| Radial velocity (R_{v}) | −32.10±1.8 km/s |
| Proper motion (μ) | RA: −32.643 mas/yr Dec.: 41.425 mas/yr |
| Parallax (π) | 8.1090±0.2844 mas |
| Distance | 400 ± 10 ly (123 ± 4 pc) |
| Absolute magnitude (M_{V}) | 1.69±0.08 |

Orbit
| Period (P) | 171.62±8.68 yr |
| Semi-major axis (a) | 0.464±0.083″ |
| Eccentricity (e) | 0.961±0.014 |
| Inclination (i) | 135.2±10.5° |
| Longitude of the node (Ω) | 123.4±32.6° |
| Periastron epoch (T) | 1904.15±2.89 |
| Argument of periastron (ω) (secondary) | 274.0±22.4° |

Details
| Mass | 1.87 M_{☉} |
| Radius | 3.82+0.59 −1.27 R_{☉} |
| Luminosity | 16.5±0.7 L_{☉} |
| Temperature | 6,858±80 K |
| Metallicity [Fe/H] | +0.09 dex |
| Age | 1.20 Gyr |

Other designations
- π^{2} UMi, 18 Ursae Minoris, BD+80°487, HD 141652, HIP 76695, SAO 2588, WDS J15396+7959AB

Database references
| SIMBAD | data |

Pi^{2} Ursae Minoris, which is Latinized from π^{2} UMi / π^{2} Ursae Minoris, is a binary star system in the northern circumpolar constellation of Ursa Minor. The pair have a combined apparent visual magnitude of 6.89, which can be viewed with a pair of binoculars. They are located at a distance of approximately 400 light years from the Sun based on parallax, but are drifting closer with a radial velocity of −32 km/s.

This star was found to be a double system by O. Struve in 1832, and the pair have now completed a full orbit. There is a lot of scatter in the data though, so the grade of the orbital elements is rated as poor. The system has a high eccentricity of 0.96 and they orbit each other with a period of roughly 172 years. The magnitude 7.32 primary is an F-type main-sequence star with a stellar classification of F1V. The fainter secondary has a magnitude of 8.15 and is G-type star. At present the angular separation between both stars is 0.67 arcseconds .
