= SS Ursae Minoris =

Star in the constellation Ursa Minor

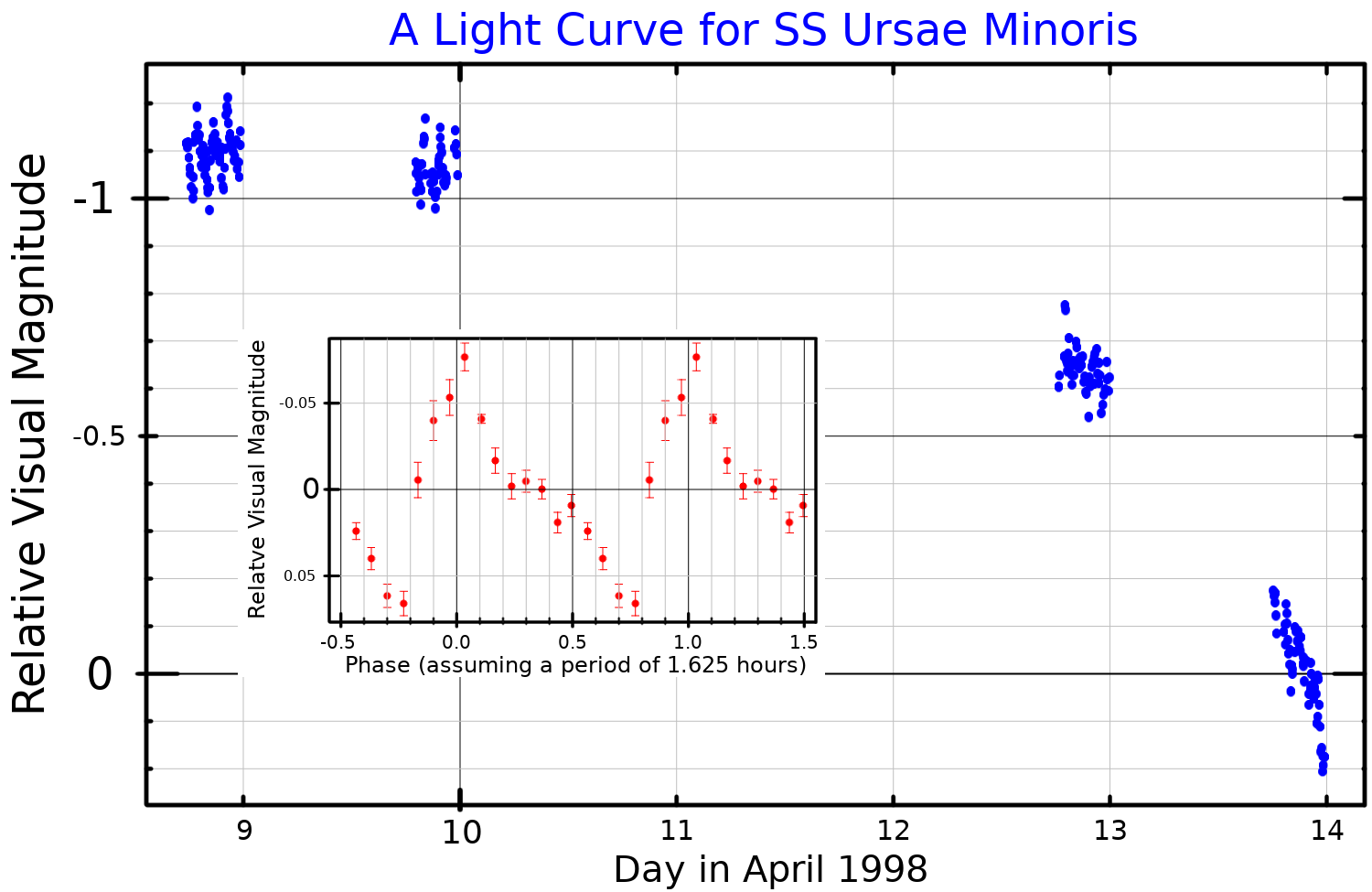
- A visual band light curve for SS Ursae Minoris. The main plot shows a superoutburst, and the inset plot shows superhumps seen on April 8-9, 1998. Adapted from Kato et al. (1998)

Observation data Epoch J2000.0 Equinox ICRS
- Constellation: Ursa Minor
- Right ascension: 15^{h} 51^{m} 22.3401^{s}
- Declination: +71° 45′ 11.834″

Characteristics
- Variable type: dwarf nova

Astrometry
Proper motion (μ)	RA: 13.085±0.080 mas/yr Dec.: −12.260±0.088 mas/yr
Parallax (π)	1.8871±0.0497 mas
Distance	1,730 ± 50 ly (530 ± 10 pc)

Details

Other designations
- 2MASS J15512233+7145118, Gaia DR2 1696309737421796352

Database references
SIMBAD	data

SS Ursae Minoris is a cataclysmic variable star system in the constellation Ursa Minor. It was discovered visually and by its X-ray emissions separately in 1982 before they were understood to be coming from the same object. It is classified as a SU Ursae Majoris variable subclass of dwarf nova in that it has both 'normal' outbursts of increased brightness as well as even brighter 'superoutbursts'. However, unlike other SU Ursae Majoris stars, the superoutbursts are of longer duration than the regular outbursts.

The two stars orbit each other every 98 minutes.
