= Maria Pride =

Welsh actress

Maria Pride (born 1970) is a Welsh television actress who plays the recurring character of Debbie Jones in the Welsh Language soap opera Pobol y Cwm.

She is a former pupil of Ysgol Gyfun Rhydfelen, near Pontypridd.

In February 1999, she played the character of Cindy, the only female role in the premiere of playwright Patrick Jones' play Everything Must Go, in association with The Manic Street Preachers, at the Sherman Theatre, Cardiff. She also played Triste in Jones' second play, Unprotected Sex, also at the Sherman Theatre.

In 2001, Maria won the BAFTA Cymru Best Actress Award for her role as Pauline in Care, a drama written by former Tomorrow's World presenter Kieran Prendiville about child abuse in a Welsh children's home. Care was directed by Antonia Bird and starred Steven Mackintosh. In 2002, Maria starred in the Welsh Language drama, Gwyfyn.

Pride's other notable roles have been in Welsh TV comedy dramas, such as High Hopes for BBC Wales. Maria has also had minor roles in many mainstream British TV series, such as Casualty and Afterlife

Pride was the winner of the Mastermind Cymru celebrity contest.
