= 11 Ursae Minoris =

Star in the constellation Ursa Minor

- Location of 11 Ursae Minoris (invisible beside γ Ursae Minoris at this scale)

Observation data Epoch J2000.0 Equinox ICRS
- Constellation: Ursa Minor
- Right ascension: 15^{h} 17^{m} 05.88946^{s}
- Declination: +71° 49′ 26.0473″
- Apparent magnitude (V): 5.15

Characteristics
- Spectral type: K4 III
- Apparent magnitude (B): 6.664
- Apparent magnitude (J): 2.657
- Apparent magnitude (H): 1.931±0.192
- Apparent magnitude (K): 1.701±0.198
- B−V color index: 1.514±0.004

Astrometry
Radial velocity (R_{v})	−17.80±0.12 km/s
Proper motion (μ)	RA: +4.073 mas/yr Dec.: +9.477 mas/yr
Parallax (π)	7.9260±0.1249 mas
Distance	412 ± 6 ly (126 ± 2 pc)
Absolute magnitude (M_{V})	−0.37

Details
Mass	2.60+0.48 −0.44 M_{☉}
Radius	29.14±0.45 R_{☉}
Luminosity	250±6 L_{☉}
Habitable zone inner limit	15.63±0.57 AU
Habitable zone outer limit	30.65±1.10 AU
Surface gravity (log g)	1.78±0.04 cgs
Temperature	4,253±25 K
Metallicity	−0.02±0.05
Age	639+507 −278 Myr

Other designations
- Pherkad Minor, 11 UMi, BD+72°678, HD 136726, HIP 74793, HR 5714, SAO 8207, PPM 8870, GCRV 8864

Database references
SIMBAD	data
Exoplanet Archive	data

11 Ursae Minoris, formally named Pherkad Minor, is a single star located approximately 410 light-years away in the northern circumpolar constellation of Ursa Minor. The star is visible to the naked eye as a faint, orange-hued star with an apparent visual magnitude of 5.15. It is moving closer to the Earth with a heliocentric radial velocity of −17.8 km/s.

== Nomenclature ==
11 Ursae Minoris is the star's Flamsteed designation. It is sometimes named Pherkad Minor (alternatively spelled Pherkard), in reference to the brighter nearby star Pherkad (Major) which is γ Ursae Minoris. The name originated with Giuseppe Piazzi. It has also been designated as γ^{1} Ursae Minoris, in which case the brighter Pherkad is called γ^{2} Ursae Minoris, but these names are rarely used. The IAU Working Group on Star Names approved the name Pherkad Minor for 11 Ursae Minoris on 22 March 2026 and it is now so entered in the IAU Catalog of Star Names.

== Stellar properties ==
This is an aging K-type giant star with a stellar classification of K4 III. It is 600 million years old with twice the mass of the Sun. As a consequence of exhausting the hydrogen at its core, the star has expanded to 29 times the Sun's radius. It is radiating 250 times the luminosity of the Sun from its swollen photosphere at an effective temperature of 4,253 K.

== Planetary system ==
11 Ursae Minoris has a detected planet discovered in August 2009. 11 Ursae Minoris b was discovered during a radial velocity survey of 62 K type red giant stars using the 2m Alfred Jensch telescope of the Thuringian State Observatory in Germany.

A newer mass measurement of the host star implies a larger planetary mass of 14.15±1.23 M_{J}, which would likely make 11 Ursae Minoris b a low-mass brown dwarf.

The 11 Ursae Minoris planetary system
Companion (in order from star)	Mass	Semimajor axis (AU)	Orbital period (days)	Eccentricity	Inclination (°)	Radius
b	≥14.15±1.23 M_{J}	1.54 ± 0.07	516.22 ± 3.25	0.08 ± 0.03	—	—
