= HD 112014 =

Binary star in the constellation Camelopardalis

Observation data Epoch J2000 Equinox ICRS
- Constellation: Camelopardalis
- Right ascension: 12^{h} 49^{m} 06.6701^{s}
- Declination: +83° 25′ 04.221″
- Apparent magnitude (V): 5.92

Characteristics
- Spectral type: A0V + A2V
- B−V color index: 0.015±0.004

Astrometry
Radial velocity (R_{v})	+1.0 km/s
Proper motion (μ)	RA: −24.013(47) mas/yr Dec.: 18.235(46) mas/yr
Parallax (π)	8.0261±0.0401 mas
Distance	406 ± 2 ly (124.6 ± 0.6 pc)
Absolute magnitude (M_{V})	+1.75

Orbit
Period (P)	3.2865 d
Eccentricity (e)	0.0405±0.005
Longitude of the node (Ω)	211.05±0.04°
Periastron epoch (T)	JD 2424226.669
Argument of periastron (ω) (primary)	211.1°
Semi-amplitude (K_{1}) (primary)	108.34±1.05 km/s
Semi-amplitude (K_{2}) (secondary)	128.86±1.07 km/s

Details

Ba
Radius	2.88 R_{☉}
Rotational velocity (v sin i)	15±12 km/s

Bb
Radius	2.44 R_{☉}
Rotational velocity (v sin i)	13±12 km/s

Other designations
- BD+84 289, GC 17440, HD 112014, HIP 62561, HR 4892, SAO 2101, ADS 8682B, CCDM 12492+8325B, Σ 1694B, Boss 3354

Database references
SIMBAD	data

HD 112014 is a star system in the northern constellation of Camelopardalis. It is dimly visible as a point of light with an apparent visual magnitude of 5.92. The distance to this system is approximately 406 light years based on parallax measurements.

The stars HD 112028 and HD 112014 were identified as a double star by F. G. W. Struve in 1820, and are listed as WDS 12492+8325 A and B, respectively, in the Washington Double Star Catalog. The binary nature of component B, or HD 112014, was discovered by J. S. Plaskett in 1919. It is a double-lined spectroscopic binary with an orbital period of 3.29 days and an eccentricity (ovalness) of 0.04. They are separated by 0.0759 AU (11.35 Gm). Both components are A-type main-sequence stars.
