= List of Chinese spy cases in the United States =

The United States government has accused the following individuals of committing espionage against the U.S., including corporations, while working for Chinese intelligence agencies, persons, or other entities. Some have resulted in convictions while others have led to exonerations. Between March 2008 and July 2010, 44 individuals were convicted by the United States Department of Justice in 26 cases involving espionage on behalf of China.

== Accused of espionage ==
=== Xudong Yao ===
Xudong Yao, also known as "William Yao," at the time 57, is a naturalized U.S. Citizen and a software engineer wanted for his alleged involvement in the theft of proprietary information from a locomotive manufacturer in Chicago, Illinois. Yao is believed to be currently residing in China. On November 18, 2015, Yao traveled from China to O’Hare International Airport in Chicago. According to the federal indictment, he possessed stolen trade secret information, which included nine copies of a Chicago company's control system source code and systems specifications explaining how the code worked. Yao was charged with nine counts of theft of electronic files. U.S. authorities said he fled to China with the proprietary information.

=== Yanqing Ye ===
On January 28, 2020, the FBI issued an arrest warrant for Yanqing Ye on charges of being an agent of a foreign government, visa fraud, making false statements, and conspiracy. Ye is a Lieutenant of the People's Liberation Army (PLA), the armed forces of the People's Republic of China (PRC) and member of the Chinese Communist Party (CCP). While studying at Boston University's Department of Physics, Chemistry and Biomedical Engineering from October 2017 to April 2019, Ye allegedly continued to work as a PLA Lieutenant completing numerous assignments from PLA officers such as conducting research, assessing United States military websites, and sending United States documents and information to China. Ye is believed to currently be in China.

=== Li Xiaoyu and Dong Jiazhi ===
On July 21, 2020, Li Xiaoyu and Dong Jiazhi were charged in an 11-counts indictment with hacking into the computer systems of hundreds of companies, governments, non-governmental organizations, and individual dissidents, clergy, and democratic and human rights activists in the United States and abroad. The defendants had recently probed for vulnerabilities in computer networks of companies developing COVID-19 vaccines, testing technology, and treatments.

=== Zhang Haoran, Tan Dailin, Jiang Lizhi, Qian Chuan, and Fu Qiang ===
On September 16, 2020, the U.S. Department of Justice (DOJ) charged Chinese hackers Zhang Haoran, Tan Dailin, Jiang Lizhi, Qian Chuan, and Fu Qiang with breaching more than 100 companies, think tanks, universities and government agencies around the world. The DOJ linked them to APT 41 hacking activities.

=== Chenguang Gong ===
In February 2024, Chenguang Gong, 57, of San Jose, California, was arrested on federal charges alleging he stole trade secret technologies developed for use by the United States government to detect nuclear missile launches and to track ballistic and hypersonic missiles. Gong is a former engineer at a Southern California company.

=== Linwei Ding ===
On March 6, 2024, a federal grand jury indicted Linwei Ding, aka Leon Ding, charging him with four counts of theft of trade secrets in connection with an alleged plan to steal from Google LLC (Google) proprietary information related to artificial intelligence (AI) technology. Ding, 38, a national of the People's Republic of China and resident of Newark, California, transferred sensitive Google trade secrets and other confidential information from Google's network to his personal account while secretly affiliating himself with PRC-based companies in the AI industry. In February 2025, a federal grand jury issued a superseding indictment against Ding, charging him with seven counts of economic espionage and seven counts of trade secret theft, replacing the previous four-count indictment.

=== Linda Sun ===
Linda Sun (Chinese: 孙雯; pinyin: Sūn Wén; born 1983) is a Chinese-American former public servant in New York State. She served as the deputy chief diversity officer in the administration of New York state governor Andrew Cuomo (2018–2020), and deputy chief of staff to his successor, governor Kathy Hochul (2021–2022).

In September 2024, Sun was arrested and charged with eight federal crimes related to allegedly acting as an undisclosed foreign agent for the government of the People's Republic of China. Additional charges were filed in the first and second superseding indictments in February and June 2025, respectively. Her case went to trial in late 2025, and ended in a mistrial after the jury deadlocked. Prosecutors are seeking a retrial.

=== John Harold Rogers ===
In January 2025, John Harold Rogers was indicted and arrested for alleged conspiracy to steal Federal Reserve trade secrets for the Chinese government. Rogers worked as a former senior advisor to the Federal Reserve Board of Governors's division of international finance from 2010 until 2021. He allegedly shared confidential information with Chinese co-conspirators and was charged with conspiracy to commit economic espionage and with making false statements.

On February 3, 2026, a federal jury acquitted Rogers of espionage charges.

=== Jian Zhao, Li Tian, and Ruoyu Duan ===
On March 6, 2025, Jian Zhao, and Li Tian, both active-duty U.S. Army soldiers, along with Ruoyu Duan, a former U.S. Army soldier, were arrested. Tian and Duan were charged with conspiring to commit bribery and theft of government property, specifically U.S. military information. Zhao was charged with conspiring to obtain and transmit national defense information to individuals based in China, and also for bribery and theft of government property.

=== Michael Charles Schena ===
On March 7, 2025, Michael Charles Schena, 42, of Alexandria, Virginia, was arrested on criminal charges related to his alleged participation in a criminal conspiracy to gather, transmit, or lose national defense information to the People's Republic of China. Schena is employed by the U.S. Department of State (DOS) working out of DOS Headquarters in Washington, D.C. and possessed a Top Secret security clearance. The FBI affidavit includes mention of Schena's invoice for an iPhone that he allegedly used to share the information. Schena was sentenced to four years in prison in September 2025.

=== Wanying Zhang ===
In October 2026, the United States Department of Justice charged Wanying "Heather" Zhang (simplified Chinese: 张婉莹; traditional Chinese: 張婉瑩; pinyin: Zhāng Wǎnyíng), a Chinese-American real estate agent in California, and others with having covertly surveilled and photographed Lai Ting-yu (Chinese: 賴廷與), the son of Taiwanese President Lai Ching-te, and his family in a suburb of Seattle, Washington, in September 2025. In the criminal complaint, a Federal Bureau of Investigation (FBI) agent stated that Zhang had acted at the direction of individuals she understood to be officials of the government of the People's Republic of China (PRC), and that the residences, vehicles, and photographs of the president's close relatives could be of use to Beijing should it seek leverage over Taiwan's president in a potential conflict.

On October 4, 2026, Zhang was arrested by federal agents at Los Angeles International Airport as she was preparing to board a flight to Shanghai, China. She was charged with acting as an agent of a foreign government without notifying the United States Attorney General as required by law. She made her initial court appearance on October 5 with the judge ordered her held in custody, and a detention hearing was scheduled for October 7. Karen Kuo, spokesperson for the Presidential Office, condemned the incident as a typical, barbaric act of "transnational repression". Taiwan's Ministry of Foreign Affairs also strongly condemned the incident the same day and called on the international community to adopt countermeasures.

=== Yin Kecheng and Zhou Shuai ===
In March 2025, the United States Department of Justice unsealed indictments against Chinese nationals Yin Kecheng (尹可成), also known as “YKC” or “YIN,” and Zhou Shuai (周帅), also known as “Coldface” or “ZHOU,” in connection with a prolonged cyber espionage campaign attributed to the threat group APT27, also known as Emissary Panda, Bronze Union, and Silk Typhoon. The indictments allege that, between 2011 and 2024, the two individuals carried out unauthorized intrusions into the networks of U.S. defense contractors, technology firms, government agencies, and other organizations to steal sensitive data for profit and on behalf of Chinese state security services, namely the Ministry of State Security (MSS) and the Ministry of Public Security (MPS). Their methods reportedly involved exploiting network vulnerabilities, deploying persistent malware, and using virtual private servers and malicious domains to exfiltrate data. Zhou is additionally accused of gathering information on telecommunications, border activity, and individuals working in media, civil service, and religious sectors, under MSS instruction. The case has been cited by U.S. officials as evidence of a growing hacking-for-hire ecosystem in China, where private actors operate with state support. As part of the enforcement action, U.S. authorities seized infrastructure used in the operations and imposed sanctions on Zhou and his firm, Shanghai Heiying Information Technology Co., Ltd., in addition to previous sanctions against Yin. Both defendants remain at large.

=== Xu Zewei and Zhang Yu ===
Xu Zewei (徐泽伟), a 33-year-old Chinese national, and Zhang Yu (张宇), 44, were indicted in the United States for their roles in a series of cyber intrusions that took place between February 2020 and June 2021. Xu, who was arrested in Milan, Italy, on July 3, 2025, at the request of U.S. authorities, was an IT manager at Shanghai Powerock Network Co. Ltd., a company alleged to have conducted hacking operations under the direction of the Shanghai State Security Bureau (SSSB), a division of China's Ministry of State Security (MSS). Zhang Yu remained at large. The indictment alleged that both individuals acted as state-sponsored hackers, targeting U.S. universities, immunologists, and virologists to steal COVID-19 research, and later exploited vulnerabilities in Microsoft Exchange Server software as part of the large-scale “HAFNIUM” campaign, which compromised thousands of computers worldwide.

The nine-count indictment, unsealed in the Southern District of Texas, charged Xu and Zhang with conspiracy to commit wire fraud, wire fraud, conspiracy to cause damage to and obtain information by unauthorized access to protected computers, obtaining information by unauthorized access, intentional damage to protected computers, and aggravated identity theft. The charges related to their alleged theft of sensitive research and mass exploitation of email servers, with maximum penalties ranging from two to twenty years per count. The indictment highlighted the use of private contractors and companies in China to obscure state involvement in cyber-espionage campaigns, resulting in widespread compromise of U.S. and global entities.

=== Chenguang Gong ===
In July 2025, Chenguang Gong, a 59-year-old dual U.S.-China citizen and former engineer at a Southern California defense contractor, reportedly pleaded guilty to one count of theft of military trade secrets. Hired in January 2023 as an application-specific integrated circuit design manager, Gong transferred over 3,600 files—many marked "proprietary" and "for official use only"—to personal devices between March and April 2023. The files included designs for advanced infrared sensors used in space-based systems to detect hypersonic, ballistic, and nuclear missiles, as well as for countering heat-seeking missiles. Over 1,800 of the files were taken after Gong had accepted a job with a competing firm. U.S. prosecutors revealed that from 2014 to 2022, Gong held positions at various U.S. tech companies while actively seeking involvement in Chinese government "Talent Programs," which aim to recruit overseas experts for technology transfer, including for military applications. Gong also proposed projects to Chinese organizations involving military-grade sensor technology and traveled to China to seek funding, stating his intent to support China's high-end military integrated circuit development.

=== Alice Huang ===
On October 29, 2026, The New York Times reported that Jensen Huang, the co-founder and CEO of Nvidia, had been the target of a spy plot involving the government of China, citing people briefed on U.S. intelligence surveillance who spoke on condition of anonymity. Huang had an extramarital affair with Alice Huang (no relation), a Chinese national who was an executive of Megaspeed, a Singaporean company. U.S. officials reportedly suspected that she had been recruited by China's Ministry of State Security as a spy. On November 11, the Times reported, citing five Nvidia employees, that Jensen Huang had also had an extramarital relationship with Kimberly Powell, an executive who reported to him. That same day, Nvidia's board met to discuss his ouster and accepted his resignation, which the company announced the following day.

President Donald Trump was briefed on the intelligence in 2025 and in May 2026, and chose not to act. U.S. officials did not warn Jensen Huang through a defensive briefing. On November 12, Attorney General Todd Blanche said the Justice Department had reached no conclusion about whether Alice Huang was a spy, and CNN reported, citing multiple sources, that the intelligence collected on her did not prove she had acted as one. The next day, the Times reported that multiple people who had reviewed the underlying U.S. intelligence stated that they were confident in their information about her interactions with Chinese intelligence and believed she was an "asset" rather than a trained intelligence officer, and that the investigations were still ongoing. On November 16, Trump said he did not know whether she was a spy.

Singapore's Ministry of Home Affairs said there was insufficient evidence that Alice Huang had committed the suspected offenses relating to possible false declarations in server purchases, and that Singapore did not investigate her for espionage. She was issued a stern warning and barred from re-entering Singapore after police assessed that she had knowingly given them inaccurate information about her role in Megaspeed; inquiries into Megaspeed continue. The Chinese government denied involvement, dismissing the claims as "groundless speculation". Megaspeed said that Alice Huang had left the company in August 2025, and that media reports contained assertions about its business that were "not supported by verifiable evidence".

== Accused of related crimes ==
=== Mingqing Xiao ===
On April 21, 2021, Mingqing Xiao, 59, a mathematics professor and researcher at Southern Illinois University Carbondale, was charged with two counts of wire fraud and one count of making a false statement. Xiao is accused of fraudulently obtaining $151,099 in federal grant money from the National Science Foundation (NSF) by concealing additional sources of funding from Shenzhen University and a government science foundation in Guandong province of China.

== Pled guilty or convicted (espionage) ==
=== Larry Wu-tai Chin ===
In February 1986, Larry Wu-tai Chin was convicted of 17 counts of espionage, conspiracy, and tax evasion, including two life terms, but killed himself before he could be sentenced.

Chin worked in the U.S. intelligence community for nearly 35 years while providing China with classified information. Chin was recruited as a spy by a CCP official when he started working as a translator for the Americans in Fuzhou in 1944; in 1948 he started as an interpreter at the U.S. consulate in Shanghai then later Korea; in 1952 he was hired by the CIA's Foreign Broadcast Information Service, who transferred him to California in 1961. After he became an American citizen in 1965 he was transferred to Arlington, Virginia, where he had access to reports from intelligence agents abroad and translations of documents acquired by CIA officers in China. He met his case officer, Ou Qiming, on visits to Hong Kong from the 1950s onwards, and had a New York emergency contact in the 1970s: Father Mark Cheung at the Church of the Transfiguration in Chinatown, whom the China's Ministry of State Security (MSS) had sent to a Catholic seminary in order to infiltrate the Catholic Church, despite having a wife in China. Chin sold classified National Intelligence Estimates pertaining to China and Southeast Asia to China, enabling China to discover weaknesses in its intelligence agencies and compromise U.S. intelligence activities in the region. He betrayed Chinese POWs whom he had interviewed in Korea, believed to have been executed or incarcerated on their return to China. He provided sensitive information about Richard Nixon's plans for normalizing relations with China two years before the president visited the country. Upon retirement in 1981 aged 59, Chin was awarded a Career Intelligence Medal by the CIA then a week later flew to Hong Kong to be paid a retirement bonus by the MSS. His MSS earnings had mostly been invested in property—he owned 31 properties in the Washington, DC area alone. He was arrested in 1985 after three years' information-assembling by the FBI of multiple defectors' information.

=== Bill Gaede ===
Guillermo "Bill" Gaede (born November 19, 1952) is an Argentine engineer and programmer who is best known for Cold War industrial spying on behalf of Cuba, Iran, and China conducted while he worked at Advanced Micro Devices (AMD) and Intel Corporation (Intel). While at AMD, he provided the Cuban government with technical information from the semiconductor industry, which the Cubans passed on to the Soviet bloc, primarily to the Soviet Union and East Germany. In 1992, Gaede turned himself over to the Central Intelligence Agency (CIA), which placed him in contact with the Federal Bureau of Investigation (FBI). The FBI began working with Gaede in a counter-espionage operation intended to penetrate Cuban intelligence using his contacts on the island. During this time, Gaede obtained work at Intel Corp. in Chandler, Arizona. Intel Security discovered the nature of his activities at AMD and terminated him, but not before Gaede filmed Intel's state-of-the-art Pentium process from home.

=== Peter Lee ===
In December 1997, Peter Lee, 58, a physicist born in China who worked at the Los Alamos National Laboratory and later for TRW Inc., pleaded guilty to lying on security-clearance forms and passing classified national-defense information to Chinese scientists on business trips to Beijing. In March 1998, he was sentenced to 12 months in a halfway house and three years’ probation and was ordered to pay $20,000 in fines and perform 3,000 hours of community service. He compromised classified weapons information, microwave submarine-detection technology and other national-defense data, and the Department of Energy later concluded that his disclosure of classified information "was of significant material assistance to the PRC in their nuclear weapons development program ... This analysis indicated that Dr. Lee's activities have directly enhanced the PRC nuclear weapons program to the detriment of U.S. national security."

=== Fei Ye and Ming Zhong ===
Fei Ye, a U.S. citizen; and Ming Zhong, a permanent resident of the United States; were arrested at the San Francisco International Airport on November 23, 2001. They were accused of stealing trade secrets in designing a computer microprocessor to benefit China, although prosecutors did not allege that the Chinese government knew of their activities. In December 2002, they were charged with a total of ten counts, including conspiracy; economic espionage; possession of stolen trade secrets; and foreign transportation of stolen property. In 2006 (five years after their arrest), they pleaded guilty to two counts each of economic espionage. In 2008, they were sentenced to a year in prison. The maximum sentence is 30 years however prosecutors asked for less because of their cooperation. The case resulted in the first convictions under the Economic Espionage Act of 1996.

=== Moo Ko-Suen ===
In May 2006, Ko-Suen "Bill" Moo pleaded guilty to being a covert agent of China. Moo attempted to purchase United States military equipment to send to China when he was arrested by undercover United States agents. Some of the equipment included an F-16 fighter jet engine, an AGM-129A cruise missile, UH-60 Black Hawk helicopter engines and AIM-120 air-to-air missiles.

=== Ronald Montaperto ===
Ronald N. Montaperto is a former Defense Intelligence Agency (DIA) analyst who pleaded guilty in June 2006 to mishandling classified documents. U.S. officials said the disclosures by Montaperto coincided with the loss of a major electronic eavesdropping program which had successfully spied on Chinese government links to illicit arms sales. Montaperto was sentenced to three months in jail.

=== Chi Mak ===
In May 2007, Chi Mak was convicted of conspiring to export U.S. defense technology to China, including data on an electronic propulsion system capable of making submarines undetectable. In 2008, he was sentenced to a 24 1/2-year prison term for espionage.

Chi Mak is a Chinese-born engineer who worked for L-3 Communications, a California-based defense contractor, as a support engineer on Navy quiet-drive propulsion technology. According to recovered documents, he was instructed by his Chinese contacts to join "more professional associations and participate in more seminars with 'special subject matters' and to compile special conference materials on disk". He was instructed to gather information on space-based electromagnetic intercept systems, space-launched magnetic-levitation platforms, electromagnetic gun or artillery systems, submarine torpedoes, electromagnetic launch systems, aircraft carrier electronic systems, water-jet propulsion, ship submarine propulsion, power-system configuration technology, weapons-system modularization, technologies to defend against nuclear attack, shipboard electromagnetic motor systems, shipboard internal and external communications systems and information on the next generation of U.S. destroyers. He copied and sent sensitive documents on U.S. Navy ships, submarines and weapons to China by courier.

=== Gregg Bergersen and Tai Shen Kuo ===
In 2008, Gregg William Bergersen was a weapons systems policy analyst for the United States Defense Security Cooperation Agency. A director of C4ISR programs, he was found guilty of spying for the People's Republic of China. A resident of Alexandria, Virginia, he sold classified defense information to Tai Kuo, a naturalized citizen originally from Taiwan, who was a New Orleans furniture salesman. Kuo convinced Bergersen that the information would be given to Taiwan, but then forwarded the information to the PRC government. Kuo allegedly handed the information to Yu Xin Kang, a lawful resident alien also living in New Orleans. Kang in turn allegedly gave the information to a spy for the Chinese government. Bergersen was sentenced to 57 months in prison and Kuo received 16 years in prison.

=== Anne Lockwood, Michael Haehnel, and Fuping Liu ===
In February 2009, three former employees of Metaldyne Corporation were sentenced to prison terms in federal court in connection with a conspiracy to steal confidential information from the company, according to Acting United States Attorney Terrence Berg. Anne Lockwood, formerly a vice president for Sales at Metaldyne, her husband Michael Haehnel, formerly a senior engineer at Metaldyne, and Fuping Liu, a former metallurgist for Metaldyne. Lockwood and Liu both pleaded guilty on September 15, 2008, to the main count of the indictment, conspiracy to steal confidential and proprietary information belonging to Metaldyne, and using the stolen information in order to assist a Chinese competitor, the Chongqing Huafu Industry Company ("Huafu"), of Chongqing, China to compete against Metaldyne in the field of powdered metal parts. Haehnel pleaded guilty to a misdemeanor offense charging him with unlawfully accessing stored electronic records. Beginning in May 2004, Lockwood and Liu developed a business plan to help Huafu compete against Metaldyne in the production of powdered metal products. Lockwood obtained both electronic and paper copies of confidential and proprietary information pertaining to Metaldyne's internal costs and its manufacturing processes, and then provided some of that information to Huafu, in China, to assist it in competing against Metaldyne. Lockwood received 30 months in prison, Haehnel received six months in prison, and Liu received nine months.

=== Glenn Duffie Shriver ===
Glenn Duffie Shriver pleaded guilty in October 2010 to one count of conspiracy to commit unlawful conveyance of national defense information and was sentenced to four years in prison on January 21, 2011.

Shriver was born November 23, 1981, in Henrico County, Virginia. He attended Grand Valley State University (GVSU) in Allendale, Michigan. In 2001, he took part in a 45-day summer study program in Shanghai, China. He subsequently spent his junior year at East China Normal University, also in Shanghai. After graduating from GVSU in 2004 with a bachelor's in international relations, Shriver returned to Shanghai to work and to study the Chinese language, in which he eventually became proficient. He had a few acting jobs in the Chinese film industry.

In about 2004, Shriver answered an ad to write a paper about U.S.–China relations with regard to Taiwan and North Korea. A Chinese woman calling herself "Amanda" praised his paper and paid him US$120. This was a type of low-key initial approach, common while recruiting intelligence operatives. Amanda eventually introduced Shriver to a "Mr. Wu" and "Mr. Wang". Amanda, Wu, and Wang, all operatives of the Chinese Ministry of State Security, encouraged him to apply for jobs with the United States government or law enforcement, rather than the more common approach of recruiting an existing agent.

Soon they told him they were interested in obtaining classified material, and paid him $10,000 to take the United States Foreign Service Exam in Shanghai in 2005, though he failed to pass. He was paid $20,000 for a second attempt at the exam in 2006 which he also failed. Shriver next applied for a position as a clandestine officer with the National Clandestine Service branch of the CIA in 2007. This time he requested and received payment of $40,000 from the Chinese. He took the money to the United States, but failed to report it, as required by law.

In June 2010, Shriver was arrested while trying to depart Detroit Metropolitan Wayne County Airport for South Korea and charged with five counts of "making false statements" and one count of "willfully conspiring to provide national defense information to intelligence officers of the PRC". He was denied bail and prosecuted by Stephen M. Campbell, a United States attorney in Alexandria, Virginia.

Shriver was facing up to 10 years in prison under Section 793, but the prosecutor had also threatened him with a prosecution under Section 794 which had a maximum of life imprisonment. Shriver pleaded guilty in October 2010 to one count of conspiracy to commit unlawful conveyance of national defense information as part of a plea bargain which included a full debriefing and polygraph testing. On January 21, 2011, he was sentenced to four years in prison by judge Liam O'Grady. Shriver had met with his handlers about 20 times, most often "Amanda", and taken in $70,000. Shriver said "I made a terrible decision. Somewhere along the way I got into bed with the wrong people. I cannot tell you what it's like to carry a dark secret like this for so many years." Professor Geling Shang, one of the leaders of Shriver's summer study group, had worried that Shriver had no sense of what he wanted to do with his life. Shriver stated that he had been motivated by greed. He served his sentence at the Federal Correctional Institution near Elkton, Ohio. Shriver was released from federal prison in late 2013.

Shriver's experience was dramatized in the short film Game of Pawns, produced by the Counter-Intelligence Unit of the FBI and released online in April 2014. One of the film's goals was to warn students of dangers in China. It featured the actor Joshua Murray as Shriver.

=== Ji Li Huang and Xaio Guang Qi ===
Ji Li Huang and Xiao Guang Qi pleaded guilty in 2012 to participating in a conspiracy to steal trade secrets from Pittsburgh Corning. Huang was the CEO of Ningbo Oriental Crafts Ltd., and Qi was his employee. The FBI produced a movie in 2020 based on them called The Company Man, Protecting America's Secrets. Huang was sentenced to 18 months in federal prison without parole and ordered to pay a fine of $250,000. Qi was sentenced to time served and ordered to pay a fine of $20,000. They were deported back to China after serving their sentences.

=== Bryan Underwood ===
Bryan Underwood, a former civilian guard at a U.S. Consulate compound under construction in Guangzhou China, was sentenced on March 5, 2013, to nine years in prison in connection with his efforts to sell for personal financial gain classified photographs, information, and access related to the U.S. Consulate to China's Ministry of State Security (MSS).

=== Walter Liew ===
In July 2014, Walter Lian-Heen Liew (aka Liu Yuanxuan) was sentenced to serve 15 years in prison for violations of the Economic Espionage Act, tax evasion, bankruptcy fraud, and obstruction of justice. Liew was convicted in March 2014 on each of the twenty counts charged. His company was found by the jury to steal trade secrets from E.I. du Pont de Nemours & Company to state-owned companies of China, Pangang Group companies.

=== Candace Marie Claiborne ===
On March 28, 2017, The F.B.I. arrested Candace Marie Claiborne, of the U.S. State Department. She allegedly "failed to report her contacts with Chinese foreign intelligence agents who provided her with thousands of dollars of gifts and benefits", said Acting Assistant Attorney General McCord. "Claiborne used her position and her access to sensitive diplomatic data for personal profit. Pursuing those who imperil our national security for personal gain will remain a key priority of the National Security Division." On April 24, 2019, Candace Claiborne pleaded guilty to a charge of conspiracy to defraud the United States, by lying to law enforcement and background investigators, and hiding her extensive contacts with, and gifts from, agents of the People's Republic of China (PRC), in exchange for providing them with internal documents from the U.S. State Department. The statutory maximum penalty for a person convicted of conspiracy to defraud the United States is five years in prison. On July 9, 2019, Claiborne was sentenced to 40 months in prison followed by three years of supervised release and a fine of $40,000.

=== Kevin Mallory ===
In June 2017, Kevin Patrick Mallory was arrested and charged under the Espionage Act on charges of performing espionage on behalf of the Chinese government. Mallory was having financial difficulties when he was contacted by a "headhunter", who turned out to be a Ministry of State Security (MSS) operative. The operative set up a phone call with Mallory and another person, pretending it was a job with the Shanghai Academy of Social Sciences. After two visits to China, Mallory consented to selling defense secrets to his Chinese contacts. Mallory was given special communications devices for communicating documents to Chinese intelligence agents, including documents classified as top secret. The individuals alleged to be working for China's intelligence services represented themselves as working for the Shanghai Academy of Social Sciences, a common cover for officers of the Shanghai State Security Bureau, a regional branch of the Ministry of State Security. Some of the material in his possession is alleged to contain sensitive information on human intelligence sources.

Mallory graduated from Brigham Young University in 1981, and resided in Leesburg, Virginia. Prior to his arrest, Mallory had served in the United States Army and worked as a Special Agent for the Diplomatic Security Service from 1987 to 1990. Mallory worked for the Defense Intelligence Agency at some point in his career. He was a self-employed consultant for GlobalEx, LLC. Mallory had previously worked for the CIA (as a case officer between 1990 and 1996, and as a contractor between 2010 and 2012) and at the American Institute in Taiwan.

On July 7, 2017, during preliminary court proceedings, U.S. District Judge T. S. Ellis III ordered Mallory's bond revoked, judging him to be a flight risk and a potential threat to national security. The FBI hacked into his cell phone and retrieved eight documents, some of which were top secret. In a call to his son, he had attempted to arrange to secrete case evidence in his home. Mallory was convicted on June 8, 2018, of four charges: conspiracy to deliver, attempted delivery, delivery of defense information to aid a foreign government, and making material false statements (18 USC §§ 793 and 1001). He was sentenced to 20 years in May 2019.

=== Xu Jiaqiang ===
Xu Jiaqiang pleaded guilty to charges of economic espionage, theft, and possession and distribution of trade secrets, after having been accused of stealing the source code to IBM software, with the intention of benefiting the National Health and Family Planning Commission. On January 18, 2018, Xu was sentenced to five years in prison by District Judge Kenneth M. Karas. Xu previously pled guilty to all six counts with which he was charged.

=== Jerry Chun Shing Lee ===
In January 2018, the FBI arrested former CIA officer Jerry Chun Shing Lee, charging him with unlawful possession of defense information. He may have compromised the identities of numerous CIA spies in China. Jerry Chun Shing Lee, a naturalized U.S. citizen, had worked for the CIA with a top-secret security clearance from 1994 until 2007. Several years after his departure from the CIA, China began capturing and killing U.S. informants. Officials in the U.S. began investigating whether a mole was responsible for outing the identities of sources working with the U.S. In May 2018, Lee was formally charged with conspiracy to commit espionage on behalf of China.

According to the indictment, he met two intelligence officers from China's Ministry of State Security in Shenzhen in April 2010, and they gave him "a gift of $100,000 cash in exchange for his cooperation", with the promise that "they would take care of him for life". Lee received hundreds of thousands of dollars in cash that he deposited into his HSBC bank accounts in Hong Kong between 2010 and 2013, the same time the CIA lost 18 to 20 Chinese informants who were killed or imprisoned for providing sensitive information to the U.S. government. Lee started working for Japan Tobacco International in Hong Kong in 2007, the same year he left the CIA. In 2009, Japan Tobacco International terminated his contract amid suspicions that he was leaking sensitive information about its operations to Chinese authorities. He then set up his own company, also related to the import of cigarettes, which did not succeed. According to court papers, Lee's business partner in Hong Kong arranged meetings and passed messages from Chinese intelligence officers to him. From June 2013 to September 2015, he worked for Estée Lauder. At the time of his arrest, he was the head of security at Christie's in Hong Kong.

In May 2019, he pleaded guilty and was sentenced in November 2019 to 19 years in prison.

=== Ron Rockwell Hansen ===
On June 4, 2018, Ron Rockwell Hansen, a U.S. Army veteran and former Defense Intelligence Agency (DIA) officer, was arrested on federal charges including the attempted transmission of national defense information to the People's Republic of China. The FBI agents took Hansen into custody while he was on his way to Seattle-Tacoma International Airport in Seattle to board a connecting flight to China.

Hansen is charged with attempted espionage, acting as an unregistered foreign agent for China, bulk cash smuggling, structuring monetary transactions, and smuggling goods from the United States. If convicted, Hansen faces a maximum penalty of life in prison. On March 15, 2019, Hansen pleaded guilty in the District of Utah in connection with his attempted transmission of national defense information to the People's Republic of China. On September 26, 2019, Hansen was sentenced to 10 years in federal prison.

=== Hongjin Tan ===
Following his December 2018 arrest, Hongjin Tan pleaded guilty in November 2019, and was sentenced in February 2020 for stealing proprietary information worth more than $1 billion from his employer, a U.S. petroleum company where he was employed from June 2017 until December 2018 as an associate scientist.

=== Xuehua Edward Peng ===
On September 30, 2019, the FBI arrested Xuehua Peng, also known as Edward Peng, 56, for acting as an illegal foreign agent in delivering classified United States national security information to officials of the People's Republic of China's Ministry of State Security (MSS). Mr Peng, 56, of Hayward, California, was caught on FBI surveillance video completing a "dead drop" in a Northern California hotel room, and allegedly completed five more dead drops between 2015 and 2018. He was arrested on September 27, 2019, at his residence in Hayward, California, and denied bail at a court hearing. On March 16, 2020, Peng was sentenced to 48 months in prison, and ordered to pay a $30,000 fine.

=== Hao Zhang ===
On June 26, 2020, Hao Zhang, 41, of China, was found guilty of economic espionage, theft of trade secrets, and conspiring to commit both offenses. Zhang conspired to and did steal trade secrets from two U.S. electronics companies: Avago and Skyworks. Zhang intended to steal the trade secrets for the benefit of the People's Republic of China.

=== Yeo Jun Wei ===
Yeo Jun Wei, also known as Dickson Yeo, a Singaporean national, pled guilty on July 24, 2020, to acting in the United States as an illegal agent of Chinese intelligence. Yeo admitted to using the professional networking website LinkedIn and setting up a fake consulting company to target U.S. government employees and an Army officer to obtain classified and sensitive information for the Chinese government.He was sentenced to 14 months in prison in October 2020.

=== Li Chen ===
On July 30, 2020, Li Chen pled guilty to conspiring to steal proprietary exosome-related trade secrets from a U.S. hospital research institute and for associated wire fraud. On February 1, 2021, Chen was sentenced to 30 months in prison.

In July 2019, federal agents arrested husband and wife couple Yu Zhou, 49, and Li Chen, 46, currently of San Diego, California, for stealing medical secrets from the former employer. The couple conspired to, attempted to and did steal scientific trade secrets related to exosomes and exosome isolation from Nationwide Children's Hospital's Research Institute for their own personal financial gain. The husband and wife allegedly founded a company in China in 2015 without the hospital's knowledge. While Zhou and Chen continued to be employed by Nationwide Children's, they marketed products and services related to exosome isolation through their Chinese company. In September 2019, they were charged with crimes related to stealing exosome-related trade secrets concerning the research, identification and treatment of a range of pediatric medical conditions.

=== Wei Sun ===
On November 28, 2020, Wei Sun, a 49 year old Chinese national and former Raytheon engineer, was sentenced to 38 months in prison after pleading guilty to one felony count of violating the Arms Export Control Act (AECA). Sun was employed in Tucson, Arizona, for 10 years as an electrical engineer with Raytheon Missiles and Defense where he had access to classified national defense information. From December 2018 to January 2019, Sun traveled from the United States to China on a personal trip and transmitted sensitive military related technology to China.

=== Shuren Qin ===
In April 2021, Qin pleaded guilty in federal court in Boston in connection with illegally procuring and causing the illegal export of $100,000 worth of U.S. origin goods to Northwestern Polytechnical University (NWPU), a Chinese military university that is heavily involved in military research and works closely with the People's Liberation Army on the advancement of its military capabilities. In June 2018, Qin was arrested on accusations that he shipped 78 hydrophones for use in anti-submarine warfare to the Northwestern Polytechnical University, which is affiliated with the People's Liberation Army.

=== Yi-Chi Shih ===
In July 2021, Yi-Chi Shih was sentenced to over five years in prison. Shih, an electrical engineer and a University of California, Los Angeles professor, was found guilty in June 2019 by a Los Angeles jury on 18 counts related to smuggling computer chips containing military secrets to China.

=== Yanjun Xu ===
Yanjun Xu, also known as Qu Hui and Zhang Hui, a Deputy Division Director for China's Ministry of State Security (MSS), was convicted of espionage and theft of trade secrets related offenses in 2021 and sentenced to 20 years in prison. Xu is the first Chinese intelligence officer ever to be captured and extradited to the United States for trial. In October 2018 Xu was charged with conspiring and attempting to commit economic espionage and steal trade secrets from multiple U.S. aviation and aerospace companies. Xu was arrested in Belgium in April 2018 following the filing of a criminal complaint against him in Cincinnati. The United States alleged that Xu engaged in espionage against GE Aviation and other companies. Xu was accused of seeking to steal trade secrets from leading aviation firms, top Justice Department officials said. Xu recruited experts to travel to China, often under the guise of asking them to deliver a university presentation and passing himself off as an official with the Jiangsu Science and Technology Promotion Association. Xu often exchanged information with individuals at Nanjing University of Aeronautics and Astronautics, one of the top engineering schools in China, which has significant influence over the country's aerospace industry, according to court documents.

After his conviction in November 2021 of conspiring and attempting to commit economic espionage, conspiracy to commit trade secret theft, and two counts of attempted theft of trade secrets, Xu was sentenced to 20 years in prison. In November 2024, Xu and two other Chinese nationals held by the United States were swapped for three Americans held by China.

=== Xiang Haitao ===
On January 6, 2022, Xiang Haitao, 44, pleaded guilty to stealing proprietary software developed by Monsanto to help farmers improve crop yields. On April 7, 2022, he was sentenced to 29 months in prison, followed by three years of supervised release, and was fined $150,000 for conspiracy to commit economic espionage.

=== Xiaorong You (Shannon You) ===
On May 9, 2022, Dr. Xiaorong You, aka Shannon You, 59, of Lansing, Michigan was sentenced to serve 168 months in prison followed by three years of supervised release and pay a $200,000 fine. In April 2021, a federal jury convicted You of conspiracy to commit trade secret theft, conspiracy to commit economic espionage, possession of stolen trade secrets, economic espionage, and wire fraud. You stole valuable trade secrets related to formulations for bisphenol-A-free (BPA-free) coatings for the inside of beverage cans while working at The Coca-Cola Company in Atlanta, Georgia, and Eastman Chemical Company in Kingsport, Tennessee. The stolen trade secrets belonged to major chemical and coating companies, including Akzo-Nobel, BASF, Dow Chemical, PPG, Toyochem, Sherwin Williams, and Eastman Chemical Company, and cost nearly $120,000,000 to develop.

=== Shapour Moinian ===
On June 23, 2022, Shapour Moinian, 67, of San Diego, California, pleaded guilty to lying on his SF-86 security clearance forms and to being a paid unregistered agent of the government of China. Moinian is a former U.S. Army helicopter pilot who accepted thousands of dollars from representatives of the Chinese government to provide aviation-related information from his defense-contractor employers. At sentencing, Moinian faces a maximum penalty of 10 years in prison and a fine of up to $250,000 for acting as an agent of a foreign government, and up to five years and a $250,000 fine for the false statements count. On November 7, 2022, Moinian was sentenced to 20 months in prison.

=== Ji Chaoqun ===
Ji Chaoqun was convicted in September 2022 of spying, conspiracy to act as an agent of China's Ministry of State Security without notifying the U.S. Attorney General, and making false statements on a government form about his contacts with foreign agencies. He was acquitted on two charges of wire fraud, related to enlisting in the U.S. Army Reserves. In late January 2023, Ji was sentenced to eight years in prison.

Ji, 27, a Chinese citizen residing in Chicago, was arrested in Chicago on September 25, 2018, for allegedly acting within the United States as an illegal agent of the People's Republic of China. Ji, who Yanjun Xu, worked at the direction of a high-level intelligence officer in Jiangsu State Security Department (JSSD) of China's MSS, according to a criminal complaint and affidavit filed in U.S. District Court in Chicago. Ji was tasked with providing the intelligence officer with biographical information on eight individuals for possible recruitment by the JSSD, according to the complaint. The individuals included Chinese nationals who were working as engineers and scientists in the United States, some of whom were U.S. defense contractors, according to the complaint. He was formally indicted on January 24, 2019. Ji had enlisted in the U.S. Army Reserves through the Military Accessions Vital to the National Interest (MAVNI) program. In November 2024, Ji and two other Chinese nationals held by the United States were swapped for three Americans held by China.

=== Wenheng Zhao ===
On January 8, 2024, Navy servicemember Wenheng Zhao was convicted of transmitting sensitive U.S. military information to an intelligence officer from the People's Republic of China (PRC) in exchange for bribery payments. He was sentenced to 27 months in prison and ordered to pay a $5,500 fine. Zhao was charged with conspiracy and receipt of a bribe by a public official in August 2023. His indictment was announced at the same time as Jinchao Wei's, though the cases are separate. Zhao is accused of passing information to Chinese officials, including about a radar system in Okinawa and a Pacific Ocean military exercise.

=== Jinchao Wei ===
In August 2025, Navy servicemember Jinchao 'Patrick' Wei was convicted of providing sensitive information about U.S. warship capabilities to China. He was found guilty on six counts, including two of espionage and four of conspiracy, to be sentenced on December 1, 2025. He was sentenced to more than 16 years in prison. In August 2023, Wei was charged with espionage. He was a machinist's mate with a U.S. security clearance on the amphibious assault ship U.S.S. Essex stationed at Naval Base San Diego. According to the indictment, Wei passed photos, videos, and documents concerning Navy ships to a Chinese intelligence officer in 2022.

=== Alexander Yuk Ching Ma ===
On May 24, 2024, 67-year-old former Central Intelligence Agency (CIA) officer Alexander Yuk Ching Ma pled guilty to conspiring to gather and deliver national defense information to the PRC. Ma will be sentenced on September 11, 2024, to approximately ten years in prison.

In August 2020, the FBI arrested Ma over allegations that Ma had given classified material to Chinese handlers in exchange for cash and gifts. Ma and an unnamed blood-relative co-conspirator (CC #1) were naturalized U.S. citizens who were born in Hong Kong and Shanghai, respectively. Both Ma and CC #1 worked for the CIA — CC #1 from 1967 until 1983, Ma from 1982 until 1989. Ma was hired as a contract linguist for the Federal Bureau of Investigation from 2004 to 2012. The FBI, aware by this point of Ma's activities, made the determination to notionally hire the defendant to work at an FBI off-site location in Honolulu. This ruse was for the purpose of monitoring and investigating his activities and contacts with People's Republic of China (PRC) intelligence officers.

=== Shujun Wang ===
On August 6, 2024, Shujun Wang, 75, was convicted on four accounts: acting and conspiring to act as an agent of a foreign government without prior notification to the U.S. Attorney General, criminal use of identification, and making false statements to law enforcement. According to the Department of Justice, since at least 2006, Wang operated under the control of four Chinese Ministry of State Security officials, gathering intelligence on individuals and groups deemed subversive by China, such as Hong Kong democracy protestors, Taiwanese independence advocates, and Uyghur and Tibetan activists, both in the U.S. and abroad. Wang, a naturalized U.S. citizen of Chinese descent and an academic and author, helped start a pro-democracy organization in Queens, New York, that opposes the current communist regime in the People's Republic of China (PRC).

=== Korbein Schultz ===
On March 7, 2024, Korbein Schultz, a U.S. Army soldier and intelligence analyst with Top Secret clearance, was arrested at Fort Campbell following an indictment by a federal grand jury charging him with conspiracy to obtain and disclose national defense information, exporting technical data related to defense articles without a license, conspiracy to export defense articles without a license, and bribery of a public official. According to the indictment, Schultz, a sergeant, was assigned to the Army's 506th Infantry Battalion. According to the charges, he was paid $42,000 in exchange for dozens of sensitive security records. Officials say the criminal conspiracy began in June 2022 and continued up until his arrest. On August 13, 2024, Schultz pleaded guilty to all charges and was sentenced to seven years in prison in April 2025.

=== Joseph Daniel Schmidt ===
On June 18, 2025, former U.S. Army Sergeant Joseph Daniel Schmidt, 31, pleaded guilty to attempting to deliver national defense information and retention of national defense information. Schmidt served on active duty from 2015 to 2020. His primary assignment was at Joint Base Lewis-McChord, Washington, where he served in the 109th Military Intelligence Battalion and had access to secret and top secret information, according to an Army release.

According to records filed in the case, Schmidt was an active-duty soldier from January 2015 to January 2020. His primary assignment was at JBLM in the 109th Military Intelligence Battalion. In his role, Schmidt had access to SECRET and TOP SECRET information. After his separation from the military, Schmidt reached out to the Chinese Consulate in Turkey and later, the Chinese security services via email offering national defense information.

In March 2020, Schmidt traveled to Hong Kong and continued his efforts to provide Chinese intelligence with classified information he obtained from his military service. He created multiple lengthy documents describing various “high level secrets” he was offering to the Chinese government. He retained a device that allows for access to secure military computer networks and offered the device to Chinese authorities to assist them in efforts to gain access to such networks. Schmidt remained in China, primarily Hong Kong, until October 2023, when he flew to San Francisco. He was arrested at the airport. Schmidt faces up to ten years in prison when sentenced by U.S. District Judge John C. Coughenour on September 9, 2025.

=== Yuance Chen and Liren "Ryan" Lai ===
In June 2025, the U.S. Department of Justice charged two Chinese nationals, Yuance Chen and Liren “Ryan” Lai, with acting as agents of a foreign government without notifying the Attorney General, in violation of the Foreign Agents Registration Act (FARA). The two were accused of carrying out covert operations on behalf of China's Ministry of State Security (MSS), including attempts to infiltrate the U.S. military and gather intelligence on naval facilities and personnel.

According to court documents, Lai, who entered the United States on a visitor visa in April 2025, allegedly recruited Chen, a legal permanent resident, as an asset around 2021. Chen reportedly provided Lai with photographs and videos of U.S. Navy bases and recruiting centers, and traveled to San Diego to meet a Navy recruit and tour the USS Abraham Lincoln. The FBI also alleged that in 2022, the pair left $10,000 in cash in a California locker as payment to unidentified individuals for intelligence-related activities.

The Justice Department stated that the operation was consistent with China's broader efforts to expand its “blue-water” naval capabilities and gather strategic intelligence through clandestine means. Attorney General Pamela Bondi said the case highlighted “the Chinese government’s sustained and aggressive effort to infiltrate our military and undermine our national security.” U.S. Attorney Craig Missakian added that federal authorities would continue to pursue complex counterespionage cases aimed at protecting national defense information.

=== Eileen Wang ===
Eileen Wang (born 1969) is a Chinese-American politician who served as the mayor of Arcadia, California, from February 3 to May 11, 2026, when she resigned from office after pleading guilty to acting as a foreign agent for the People's Republic of China. Wang was elected to the Arcadia City Council on a Democratic Party ticket in November 2022.

== Pled guilty or convicted (other crimes) ==
=== James Reece Roth ===
John Reece Roth, professor emeritus of electrical and computer engineering, was convicted on September 3, 2008, of one count of conspiring with Atmospheric Glow Technology Inc., a Knoxville technology company, to unlawfully export in 2005 and 2006 fifteen different "defense articles" to a citizen of the People's Republic of China in violation of the Arms Export Control Act. He was also convicted of fifteen counts of violating the Arms Export Control Act and one count of wire fraud relating to exporting sensitive military information relating to an air force contract and depriving the university of his "honest services". On July 9, 2009, at age 72, he was sentenced to four years in prison and two years of supervised release after completion of the prison term. Between 2005 and 2006, Roth, an electrical engineering professor at the University of Tennessee (UT), and an employee of a Knoxville-based company known as Atmospheric Glow Technologies (AGT), Inc., knowingly provided export-controlled defense information to a Chinese graduate student on his research team. Roth also travelled to China with export-controlled documents. On one occasion, Roth asked the Chinese graduate student to email export-controlled material to a Chinese professor Roth visited.

It was alleged Roth disclosed technical data including fifteen different defense articles provided to a citizen of the People's Republic of China in violation of the Arms Export Control Act. The defense articles contained specific military technical data that was restricted and was associated with the Air Force project to develop plasma technology for use on weapons system drones.

=== Hua Jun Zhao ===
Hua Jun Zhao, 42, was accused of stealing a cancer-research compound from a Medical College of Wisconsin office in Milwaukee in an attempt to deliver it to Zhejiang University, according to an FBI agent's March 29, 2013, affidavit. Presiding judge Charles N. Clevert found no evidence that "Zhao had intended to defraud or cause any loss to Medical College of Wisconsin, or even to make money for himself". Zhao was convicted for "accessing a computer without authorization and obtaining information worth more than $5,000" for accessing his research on university-owned computers after school officials seized his own laptop, portable memory devices and papers.

=== Szuhsiung Ho ===
Szuhsiung Ho, aka Allen Ho, 66, a naturalized U.S. citizen, pleaded guilty to conspiracy to unlawfully engage or participate in the production or development of special nuclear material outside the U.S., without the required authorization from the U.S. Department of Energy (DOE) in violation of the Atomic Energy Act. In April 2016, a federal grand jury issued a two-count indictment against Ho; China General Nuclear Power Company (CGNPC), the largest nuclear power company in China, and Energy Technology International (ETI), a Delaware corporation. At the time of the indictment Ho was a nuclear engineer, employed as a consultant by CGNPC and was also the owner of ETI. CGNPC specialized in the development and manufacture of nuclear reactors and was controlled by China's State-Owned Assets Supervision and Administration Commission. Born in China, Ho is a naturalized U.S. citizen with dual residency in Delaware and China.

=== Bo Jiang ===
Bo Jiang, a researcher working on "source code for high technology imaging" at NASA's Langley Research Center, was arrested for lying to a federal officer on March 16, 2013, at Washington Dulles International Airport before returning to China. Jiang allegedly told the FBI that he was carrying fewer computer storage devices than he was. He was accused of espionage by Representative Frank Wolf, and was investigated for possible violations of the Arms Export Control Act. An affidavit said that Jiang had previously brought a NASA laptop with sensitive information to China. U.S. Magistrate Judge Lawrence Leonard ordered Jiang released after a federal prosecutor acknowledged that there was no evidence that he possessed sensitive, secret or classified material. According to Jiang's lawyer, Fernando Groene – a former federal prosecutor who practices out of Williamsburg, Wolf made a "scapegoat" of his client. On May 2, Jiang was cleared in federal court of the felony charge of lying to federal investigators. Jiang was nevertheless convicted for downloading copyrighted movies, television shows and sexually explicit images on the NASA-owned laptop.

=== Kun Shan Chun ===
In January 2017, Preet Bharara, the United States Attorney for the Southern District of New York, Mary B. McCord, Acting Assistant Attorney General for National Security, and William F. Sweeney Jr., Assistant Director-in-Charge of the New York Field Office of the Federal Bureau of Investigation ("FBI"), announced that Kun Shan Chun, a/k/a "Joey Chun", was sentenced to serve 24 months in prison and pay a $10,000 fine based on his conviction for acting in the United States as an agent of the People's Republic of China ("China"), without providing prior notice to the Attorney General. Chun pled guilty on August 1, 2016. U.S. District Judge Victor Marrero imposed Chun's sentence. Kun Shan Chun, a native of China and naturalized U.S. citizen, worked as an FBI technician since 1997 and had top secret clearance.

=== Zhongsan Liu ===
On September 16, 2019, Zhongsan Liu was arrested in Fort Lee, New Jersey by federal agents and charged with conspiracy to commit visa fraud for his involvement in a conspiracy to fraudulently obtain U.S. visas for Chinese government employees. U.S. Attorney Geoffrey S. Berman stated: "As alleged Zhongsan Liu conspired to obtain research scholar visas fraudulently for people whose actual purpose was not research but recruitment. Rather than helping to bring students to the U.S., Liu allegedly conspired to defraud this country’s visa system to advance his efforts to attract U.S. experts to China. Thanks to the Federal Bureau of Investigation (FBI), this alleged abuse of the visa system has been halted." Liu was released on bail and did not entered a formal plea. In March 2022, Liu was convicted for his involvement in a conspiracy to fraudulently obtain U.S. visas for Chinese government employees, which carries a maximum sentence of five years.

=== Zaosong Zheng ===
In December 2019, Zaosong Zheng, a medical student from China, was arrested at Boston Logan Airport for stealing 21 vials of biological research and attempting to smuggle them out of the United States aboard a flight destined for China. Zheng stated that he intended to bring the vials to China to use them to conduct research in his own laboratory and publish the results under his own name. Zheng was charged with making false statements, visa fraud, acting as an agent of a foreign government, conspiracy, and smuggling goods from the United States. In March 2020, Zheng was free on $100,000 bond. He pleaded guilty in December 2020, to one count of making false, fictitious or fraudulent statements. On January 6, 2021, Zheng was sentenced to time served, three years of supervised release and ordered removed from the United States. According to his attorney, Zheng had tickets to depart for China on January 7, 2021, and had agreed to not return to the U.S. for at least 10 years.

=== Charles Lieber ===
Charles M. Lieber, the former Chair of Harvard University's Chemistry and Chemical Biology Department, was arrested on January 28, 2020, on charges of making false statements to federal authorities regarding his participation in China's Thousand Talents Program, a program established by the Chinese government to recruit individuals with access to or knowledge of foreign technology and intellectual property. He was formally indicted in June 2020. On July 28, 2020, he was also charged with a superseding indictment with tax offenses for failing to report income he received from Wuhan University of Technology (WUT) in Wuhan, China. In April 2023, Lieber was sentenced on Tuesday for making false statements to the U.S. government and for failing to declare large sums of money he had been paid as part of a contract with a Chinese program, Thousand Talents, and Wuhan University in China. Lieber was convicted of the charges in December 2021 after a jury trial. He is to serve two days in prison, followed by two years of supervised release with six months of home confinement. He also is to pay a fine of $50,000 along with $34,000 restitution to the Internal Revenue Service.

=== Simon Saw-Teong Ang ===
On May 8, 2020, Simon Saw-Teong Ang, 63, of Fayetteville, Arkansas, was arrested and charged with wire fraud. Ang allegedly had close ties with the Chinese government and Chinese companies, and failed to disclose those ties when required to do so in order to receive grant money from NASA. On January 21, 2022, Ang pleaded guilty to one account of lying to the FBI about 24 patents he filed in China, and prosecutors agreed to dismiss the remaining 58 counts. On June 16, 2022, Ang was sentenced to one year and a day in prison.

=== Xiao-Jiang Li ===
Former Emory University professor Dr. Xiao-Jiang Li was convicted of filing a false tax return on May 8, 2020. Dr. Li, a former Emory University professor and Chinese Thousand Talents Program participant, worked overseas at Chinese universities and did not report any of his foreign income on his federal tax returns. Li was sentenced to one year of probation on a felony charge and was ordered to pay restitution in the amount of $35,089.

=== Zhengdong Cheng ===
On August 23, 2020, Zhengdong Cheng, a NASA Researcher and Texas A&M University professor was arrested for making false statements and wire fraud in relation to China's Talents Program. On September 22, 2022, Cheng pleaded guilty to two charges: violation of NASA regulations and falsifying official documents. As part of the plea, he agreed to pay restitution to NASA and fines, and prosecutors agreed that the 13 months he had already spent in jail was “an appropriate sentence in the matter.”

=== Turab Lookman ===
On September 15, 2020, Turab Lookman, 68, of Santa Fe, New Mexico, was sentenced to five years of probation and a $75,000 fine for providing a false statement to the Department of Energy about being employed by China.

=== Yang Yang ===
On September 16, 2020, Jacksonville, Florida, resident Yang Yang pled guilty to attempting to illegally export maritime raiding craft and engines to China. She faces a maximum of 15 years in prison.

=== Song Guo Zheng ===
In May 2021, Dr. Song Guo Zheng, an Ohio resident and rheumatology professor/researcher with "strong ties to China" was sentenced to 37 months in prison and ordered to pay over $3.8 million in restitution to the NIH and Ohio State University (at which Zheng formerly led a research team) after being convicted of making false statements to federal authorities regarding his ties to China. He had, before his sentencing, pleaded guilty to lying on NIH grant applications to spend funds helping develop China's immunology and rheumatology expertise. Zheng had lied about and hidden his connection to China's Thousand Talents Plan, which the FBI described as "a program established by the Chinese government to recruit individuals with knowledge or access to foreign technology intellectual property."

=== John Chen ===
On November 19, 2024, John Chen (aka Chen Jun), 71, was sentenced to 20 months in prison for acting as an unregistered agent of China and bribing a U.S. IRS agent as part of a scheme targeting U.S.-based practitioners of Falun Gong, a spiritual practice banned in China.

According to the U.S. Justice Department, under the direction of the Chinese government, Chen filed a whistleblower complaint with the IRS, aiming to revoke the tax-exempt status of Shen Yun Performing Arts, an organization associated with Falun Gong practitioners. Together with co-defendant Lin Feng, 44, Chen paid $5,000 in cash bribes to an undercover IRS agent to advance the complaint. Chen also offered the agent another $50,000 to initiate an audit of Shen Yun Performing Arts and 60% of any whistleblower award if his complaint succeeded.

Chen and Feng were indicted and arrested in May 2023. Feng received a time-served sentence of 16 months in prison on September 26, 2024.

=== Ping Li ===
On November 25, 2024, Ping Li, a 59-year-old Florida resident, was sentenced to four years in prison for acting as an unregistered PRC agent. Li provided China's Ministry of State Security (MSS) with corporate information about his former employers, Verizon and Infosys, and personal details about a Florida resident affiliated with the Falun Gong spiritual movement. He was indicted and arrested in July 2024 for supplying information about political dissidents, U.S. persons, and organizations to a Chinese intelligence service.

=== Ming Xi Zhang ===
On March 24, 2025, U.S. Immigration and Customs Enforcement (ICE) arrested Ming Xi Zhang, known as "Sushi John", a 61-year-old Chinese national and owner of Ya Ya Noodles in Montgomery Township, NJ. Zhang was previously convicted in April 2024 of acting as an unregistered agent of the Chinese government and sentenced to three years of probation. He is subject to deportation.

In addition, in May 2021, Zhang pleaded guilty to having served as an agent of China in 2016 without notifying the U.S. Attorney General. Zhang was believed to have colluded with Chinese security officials in the Bahamas that year and dropped off $35,000 to an individual in New Jersey. The sushi restaurant owner has also confessed to hosting an agent of the Chinese government at his Princeton home in fall 2016.

== Exonerated ==
=== Baimadajie Angwang ===
On September 21, 2020, U.S. federal prosecutors charged New York City police officer Baimadajie Angwang with acting as an illegal agent of the Chinese government, accusing him of providing intelligence about Tibetans living in the United States to two MSS officials at the Chinese consulate. Angwang was born in the Tibet region of China and is a naturalized US citizen. Angwang is also employed by the US Army Reserve. His father is a retired member of China's army and a member of the CCP. His mother is also a member of the party and a former government official. Angwang allegedly provided the consulate with access to senior NYPD officials through invitations to official events.

In January 2023, federal prosecutors dismissed all charges against Angwang. Angwang told the Associated Press that he had been speaking with Chinese officials so he could get a visa to return to Tibet, hoping to introduce his daughter to his parents. The NYPD ordered him to answer questions from internal investigators about the spying case but Angwang, on the advice of his lawyers, declined because the department refused to provide documents that would have allowed them to prepare. In 2024, Angwang was fired from his job. This was an unusually harsh penalty, according to an administrative NYPD judge as well as Angwang's lawyer. In his decision letter, NYPD commissioner Edward Caban wrote that as the department is a paramilitary organization, failure to comply with the official questioning "undermines its ability to carry out its mission". Angwang plans to sue the NYPD.

=== Guan Lei ===
Chinese national Guan Lei, 29, of Alhambra, was charged with destroying a hard drive during an FBI investigation into the possible transfer of sensitive software to China on August 28, 2020. The court dismissed the case against Guan on July 26, 2021.

=== Qing Wang ===
On May 14, 2020, Dr. Qing Wang, a former Cleveland Clinic Foundation (CCF) employee, was arrested and charged with false claims and wire fraud of more than $3.6 million in grant funding he received from the National Institutes of Health (NIH). Dr. Wang was also accused of being part of China's Thousand Talents Program. On July 15, 2021, the federal prosecutors dropped the case "after a review".

=== Xin Wang, Chen Song, and Kaikai Zhao ===
Three Chinese nationals have been charged with visa fraud. On June 7, 2020, Xin Wang was arrested at the Los Angeles International Airport and charged with visa fraud. Wang, a scientific researcher at the University of California, San Francisco (UCSF) and officer with the People's Republic of China's (PRC) People's Liberation Army (PLA), is charged with falsifying his U.S. visa application and accused of stealing secrets from the medical researchers and sending them to a military lab in China. Chen Song and Kaikai Zhao were both arrested in July 2020 for lying on their visa applications to conceal their affiliation with the PLA. The court dismissed the case against the three on July 26, 2021.

=== Gang Chen ===
In January 2021, Gang Chen, a Massachusetts Institute of Technology (MIT) professor, was indicted by a federal grand jury in connection with failing to disclose contracts, appointments, and awards from various entities in the People's Republic of China (PRC) to the U.S. Department of Energy. Gang Chen, 56, was indicted on two counts of wire fraud, one count of failing to file a foreign bank account report (FBAR) and one count of making a false statement in a tax return. Chen is a naturalized U.S. citizen who was born in China. He is a professor and researcher at MIT. Since 2012, Chen has allegedly held various appointments with the PRC designed to promote the PRC's technological and scientific development by providing advice and expertise – sometimes directly to PRC government officials – and often in exchange for financial compensation. On January 14, 2022, prosecutors recommended the charges against Chen be dropped based on "new information". On January 20, 2022, federal prosecutors dropped all charges against Chen. Officials from the Department of Energy told prosecutors that they likely still would have given Chen the grants even if he had disclosed ties to China.

=== Juan Tang ===
Juan Tang, 37, was charged with visa fraud and making false statements to the FBI about her ties to China's People's Liberation Army on a visa application involving work at the University of California, Davis. The FBI sought to arrest Tang pursuant to an Arrest Warrant and Complaint that were filed on June 26, 2020, and unsealed on July 20, 2020. In a rare move, Tang sought refuge at the Chinese consulate in San Francisco, where the Chinese government sheltered her for several weeks until she eventually left the consulate to attend a medical appointment and was arrested. On July 23, 2021, the court dismissed the case against Tang.

=== Sherry Chen ===
Xiafen "Sherry" Chen, 59, was a hydrologist for the federal government in Ohio. She was falsely accused of spying and arrested in October 2014. She was originally charged with four felonies, including that she had illegally downloaded data about national infrastructure and made false statement of telling federal agents that she last seen a Chinese official in 2011, not 2012. Five months later (in March 2015), persuaded by a lawyer, Peter R. Zeidenberg, a partner at Arent Fox in Washington, prosecutors dropped all charges against Mrs. Chen without explanation. On April 23, 2018, Chief Administrative Judge Michele Szary Schroeder ordered the U.S. Department of Commerce to reinstate Chen's employment, citing "gross injustice" in her case.

=== Guoqing Cao and Shuyu Li ===
Two former Eli Lilly and Co. employees, Guoqing Cao and Shuyu Li, were arrested in October 2013 under the charges of theft and conspiracy to commit theft involving drugs that Lilly was developing. The indictment alleged Cao and Li emailed sensitive experimental drug information worth $55 million to a competing Chinese drug company. U.S. Attorney Joe Hogsett and his deputy, Cynthia Ridgeway characterized the case as "a crime against the nation" and called the defendants as "traitors". In December 2014, the U.S. attorney's office dropped charges "in the interests of justice".

=== Anming Hu ===
Anming Hu, a Chinese-Canadian associate professor in the Department of Mechanical, Aerospace and Biomedical Engineering at the University of Tennessee, Knoxville (UTK) was arrested on February 27, 2020. Hu was charged with three counts of wire fraud and three counts of making false statements after 21 months of FBI surveillance failed to turn up evidence of espionage. Federal prosecutors alleged that Hu committed fraud by hiding his relationship with a Chinese university while receiving funding from NASA.

In June 2021, an FBI agent at Hu's trial stated that he falsely accused Hu of being a spy, baselessly implicated him as a Chinese military agent to UTK, and used false information to put him on the Federal No Fly List. The agent also stated he attempted to have Hu spy for the United States. Hu's trial for fraud ended on June 16, 2021, in a mistrial. Afterward, a juror characterized the trial as "the most ridiculous case" and the charges against Hu as "a series of plausible errors, a lack of support from UT, and ruthless ambition on behalf of the FBI." The day after the end of the trial, Democratic Representatives Ted Lieu, Mondaire Jones, and Pramila Jayapal voiced concerns about Hu's prosecution and called on Justice Department Inspector General Michael E. Horowitz to investigate allegations of FBI misconduct.

The government attempted to try Anming Hu a second time. In September, 2021 a judge acquitted him on all charges, writing "[E]ven viewing all the evidence in the light most favorable to the government, no rational jury could conclude that defendant acted with a scheme to defraud NASA".

=== Lan Lee and Yuefei Ge ===
In 2007, two Silicon Valley engineers, Lan Lee and Yuefei Ge, were charged with economic espionage for stealing microchip designs from NetLogic Microsystems, for the benefit of the Chinese military, the People's Liberation Army. Their indictment stated that the two formed a company named SICO Microsystems Inc. to facilitate the alleged theft with the possible involvement of the Chinese government. Their criminal trial started in October 2009. While prosecutors promised the jurors a "treasure trove" of evidence against the "traitors" and "spies", the defense stated the two just wanted to start their own company with their own ideas. After a month-long trial, a federal jury acquitted the two defendants on two counts and were leaning towards acquitting the two by a vote of 9–3 on two most serious counts of economic espionage. Jurors said the U.S. government failed to prove the NetLogic data was even a trade secret and much less aimed to benefit China. On October 27, 2010, after years of ordeal, the indictment against Lee and Ge was dismissed in its entirety by U.S. District Judge James Ware. During jury selection, the U.S. government attempted to remove the sole Chinese-American juror, named Yuqiang, but the defense successfully argued that he was targeted because of his racial background.

=== Wen Ho Lee ===
Wen Ho Lee is a Taiwanese-American scientist who worked for the University of California at the Los Alamos National Laboratory. He created simulations of nuclear explosions for the purpose of scientific inquiry and to improve the safety and reliability of the U.S. nuclear arsenal. In December 1999, a federal grand jury indicted him of stealing secrets about the arsenal for China.

After federal investigators could not prove the initial accusations, the government conducted a separate investigation. It could only charge Lee with improper handling of restricted data, part of the original 59-count indictment to which he pleaded guilty as part of a plea bargain. In June 2006, Lee received $1.6 million from the federal government and five media organizations as partial settlement of a civil suit he filed against them for leaking his name to the press before charges were filed against him. At the conclusion of the case, presiding federal judge James Aubrey Parker stated that he was misled "by the executive branch of our government through its Department of Justice, by its Federal Bureau of Investigation and by its United States attorney". The judge stated that while he could not speak on behalf of the executive branch "I sincerely apologize to you, Dr. Lee, for the unfair manner you were held in custody by the executive branch."

=== Katrina Leung ===
In 1982, FBI special agent James Smith recruited Katrina Leung, a 28-year-old Chinese immigrant, to work in Chinese counterintelligence. Leung, a prominent business consultant, was valued for her contacts with high-level Chinese officials, reporting back to the FBI's top Chinese-speaking counter-intelligence agents in California: James Smith and William Cleveland. Smith and Leung became involved in a sexual relationship starting shortly after he recruited her, lasting nearly two decades. Cleveland also became sexually involved with Leung from 1987, lasting around 15 years. Leung was codenamed Bureau Source 410, otherwise known as Parlor Maid, and was paid a total of $1.7m, while travelling repeatedly to China and later discovered to have 16 foreign bank accounts. At this time, Smith made classified documents available to Leung; she copied them, providing China with information on nuclear, military, and political issues. In December 1990, the National Security Agency (NSA) intercepted a telephone conversation in Chinese between a woman in Los Angeles and her Chinese handler in Beijing, whose name was Mao Guoha. She revealed to him, among other things, that William Cleveland was about to make a trip to China. The NSA passed the intercept on to the FBI who passed it to William Cleveland, who recognized the woman's voice as Katrina Leung's. James Smith made the same discovery separately. Both men covered it up for the next 12 years whilst maintaining their sexual relationships with Parlor Maid, apparently without either knowing of the other's. When she was eventually exposed, the result was either: on January 6, 2005, U.S. District Judge Florence Marie Cooper dismissed Leung's case on the grounds of prosecutorial misconduct; or that "the FBI's lawyers bungled the prosecution and she was given so nominal a penalty that she exclaimed in court, 'I love America!'".

=== Xiaoxing Xi ===
In May 2015, the United States Department of Justice accused Temple University professor Xiaoxing Xi of sending restricted American technology to China, specifically, the design of a pocket heater used in superconductor research. Xi was arrested by about a dozen FBI agents at his home, and faced charges carrying a maximum penalty of 80 years in prison and a $1 million fine. In September 2015, however, the DOJ dropped all charges against him after leading scientists, including a co-inventor of the pocket heater, provided affidavits that the schematics that Xi shared with Chinese scientists were not restricted technology, and not for a pocket heater. According to Xi's lawyer Peter Zeidenberg, the government did not understand the complicated science and failed to consult with experts before arresting him. He said that the information Xi shared, as part of "typical academic collaboration", was about a different device, which Xi co-invented and is not restricted technology. Xi has since sued the FBI, accusing the latter of falsifying evidence against him.

== See also ==
- Chinese intelligence activity abroad
- Chinese intelligence operations in the United States
  - Chinese espionage in California
  - Chinese espionage in Hawaii
- American espionage in China
