= Chinese espionage in the United Kingdom =

The government of the People's Republic of China (PRC) and various organs of the Chinese Communist Party (CCP) have conducted surveillance and espionage in the United Kingdom, according to top UK national security officials such as the head of its domestic intelligence agency MI5. UK officials, including experts at its MI5, have long been fearful that the PRC could shut down businesses in the nation with cyberattacks and spy equipment embedded in computer and telecommunications equipment.

According to Robert Hannigan, former Director of the Government Communications Headquarters, Chinese hackers have engaged in economic espionage against British universities and engineering companies, on behalf of the Chinese government.

== History ==
MI5 has reportedly monitored Chinese espionage against Rio Tinto Group computers.

In February 2021, the United Kingdom expelled three Ministry of State Security (MSS) officers who had been posing as journalists with Chinese media agencies.

In 2021, an advanced persistent threat group associated with the Hubei State Security Department in Wuhan, APT31, targeted the emails of Inter-Parliamentary Alliance on China members and 43 United Kingdom parliamentary accounts.

In September 2023, British media reported that a British diplomat at the British embassy in Beijing discovered a listening device in the teapot that the Chinese officials gave to the diplomat as a farewell gift. After returning to Britain, the diplomat found the hidden bug inside the teapot when it was accidentally dropped and smashed on the floor.

In 2023 it has been revealed that an individual known as "H6" or Yang Tengbo, alleged to be a Chinese spy, has been at the center of a controversy involving the UK government and the royal family. H6 had connections with Andrew Mountbatten-Windsor, and was invited to his birthday celebration in 2020. A royal aide, Dominic Hampshire, had given H6 permission to act on Andrew's behalf when dealing with potential investors in China. The Home Office, under then-Home Secretary, Suella Braverman, barred H6 from entering the UK in 2023 due to alleged engagement in "covert and deceptive activity" on behalf of the Chinese Communist Party (CCP). A specialized tribunal in London upheld this decision, ruling that Braverman was justified in deeming H6 a risk to national security. A judge ruled the Chinese spy allegedly had an unusual degree of trust from the royal. Housing Minister, Jim McMahon, stated that revealing H6's identity is a matter for the courts, despite growing demand among MPs for more details. Former Conservative leader, Iain Duncan Smith, plans to pose an Urgent Question in parliament regarding the United Front Work Department, which is reportedly linked to H6. Sir Iain Duncan Smith has also warned there are many more like H6 in the UK. The Chinese embassy in London has denied the allegations, accusing some UK individuals of fabricating "spy" narratives to discredit China. Prince Andrew has ceased all contact with H6 following government concerns, while there are warnings of potential additional espionage activities in the UK. Home Secretary, Yvette Cooper, emphasized the need to balance economic collaboration with China while addressing national security threats. Prime Minister of the United Kingdom, Keir Starmer, has raised his concerns of the challenge China poses.

In addition to concerns about espionage, MI5 is also worried about China covertly gaining influence. In January 2022, BBC reported that MI5 issued a rare warning to UK Parliament Members (MPs), alleging that a Chinese agent, Christine Ching Kui Lee, had infiltrated the Parliament to interfere in UK politics on behalf of the Chinese government. According to the warning, Lee "established links" with current and aspiring MPs on behalf of the CCP and provided donations to politicians, funded by foreign nationals in China and Hong Kong. In December 2024, Christine Lee lost a legal challenge against MI5. She claimed that the security alert issued against her was politically motivated and violated her human rights. However, the Investigatory Powers Tribunal unanimously rejected her case, with all three judges affirming that MI5 had acted for "legitimate reasons."

In January 2024, China's Ministry of State Security announced the arrest of a man with triple citizenship, accused of spying for the UK's MI6. The man, surnamed Huang, had allegedly gathered state secrets on repeated trips to China. In March of the same year, the UK and the U.S. jointly sanctioned Wuhan Xiaoruizhi Science and Technology, a front company of the Chinese Ministry of State Security, and affiliated individuals for cyber intrusions targeting critical infrastructure and the UK Electoral Commission. The espionage theme continued in April 2024, when two individuals were charged in the UK under the Official Secrets Act for allegedly spying on behalf of China. A month later, in May, the UK Ministry of Defence confirmed a cyberattack linked to China that compromised payroll data, including personal and financial details of defence personnel.

In November 2025, MI5 warned that Chinese intelligence operatives had been using LinkedIn to contact UK parliamentarians and other influential figures through seemingly legitimate recruiter profiles, such as those attributed to "Amanda Qiu" and "Shirly Shen," to gather information and cultivate long-term relationships; the agency said these actors conducted large-scale outreach via professional-networking sites, sometimes shifting conversations to encrypted platforms, and targeted MPs, think-tank analysts, consultants, and government officials. Fake Emails and Gmail accounts aimed at academicians and politicians were also reportedly part of such activities. Impersonators claimed to have been working for an 'IBM research center' and Google's 'AI Division'.

In October 2025, the proposed acquisition of the Telegraph Media Group by China-linked RedBird Capital Partners sparked controversy after reports linked its chair, John Thornton, to Cai Qi, a senior Chinese Communist Party official, raising concerns over potential foreign influence in UK media, though RedBird denied any Chinese involvement.

=== 2025 spying scandal ===
In October 2025 the Director of Public Prosecutions controversially dropped charges under the Official Secrets Act 1911 against Christopher Cash and Christopher Berry. Cash has been a Parliamentary researcher for Alicia Kearns MP. He had also been director of the Conservative MP's China Research Group. Investigators suspected that intelligence from the pair about Westminster had been passed to Cai Qi.

=== 2026 ===
In May 2026, former UK immigration officer, Chi Leung "Peter" Wai, and his contact Chung Biu "Bill" Yuen were found guilty of working for Chinese intelligence as part of a "shadow policing operation" against Hong Kong democracy activists in the UK.

In October 2026, MI5 warned that "more than 100 academics" linked to British institutions had "unwittingly assisted" China's espionage operations against the UK and warned universities and academics that continuing ties with China General Technology Research Institute (CGTRI) could ultimately lead to criminal charges for aiding a foreign state.

== See also ==
- Chinese intelligence activity abroad
- Cyberwarfare by China
- Intellectual property theft by China
- Transnational repression by China
- United Front Work Department
- Intelligence Bureau of the Joint Staff Department
