= Chinese espionage in California =

Ministry of State Security — 18th Bureau
- Chinese: 加州局
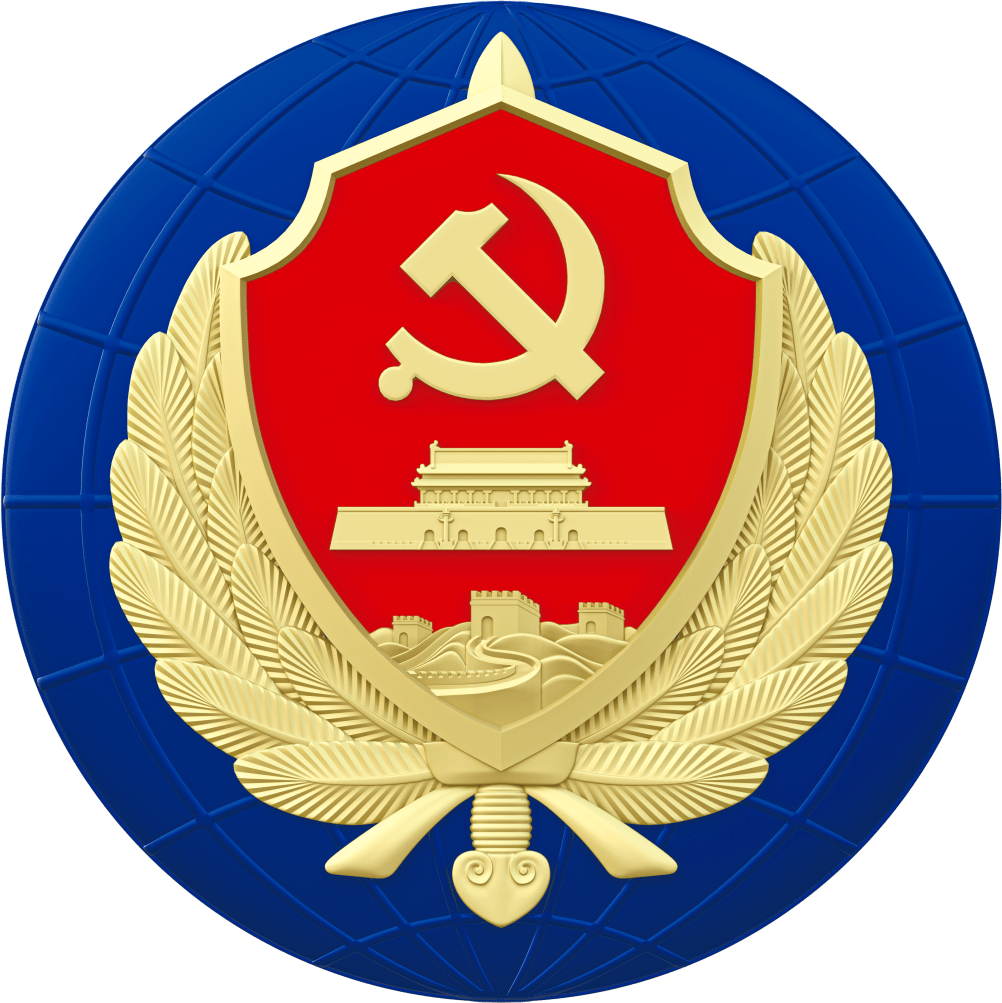
- Seal of the MSS

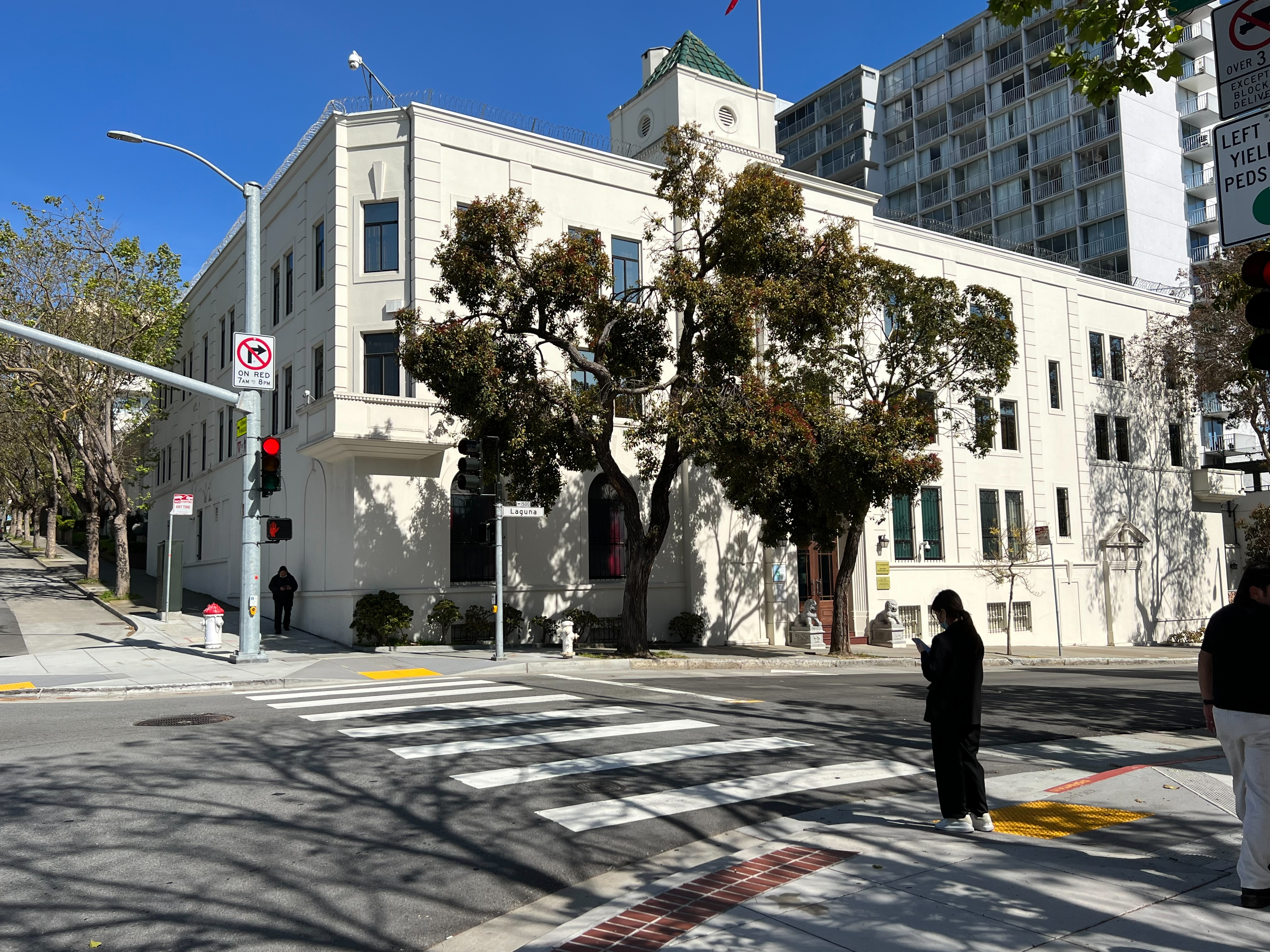
- The Chinese consulate in San Francisco, out of which the Bureau is believed to operate

Bureau overview
- Formed: 2010; 16 years ago
- Jurisdiction: California, United States
- Headquarters: Beijing, China
- Parent Ministry: Ministry of State Security

The government of the People's Republic of China and entities affiliated with the Chinese Communist Party (CCP) have undertaken influence operations, political intelligence gathering, cyber espionage, and industrial espionage in California. The state faces "the most mature" Ministry of State Security (MSS) networks of any in the United States. Activities in California are reported to be coordinated by the MSS 18th Bureau, which was established around 2010 to manage operations across the United States. Espionage activities are especially common in the San Francisco Bay Area. The Chinese government's effort is long-term; they try to recruit politicians early in their career so that if they advance to the national level, that politician will be primed to advocate for Chinese government interests.

== Organization ==
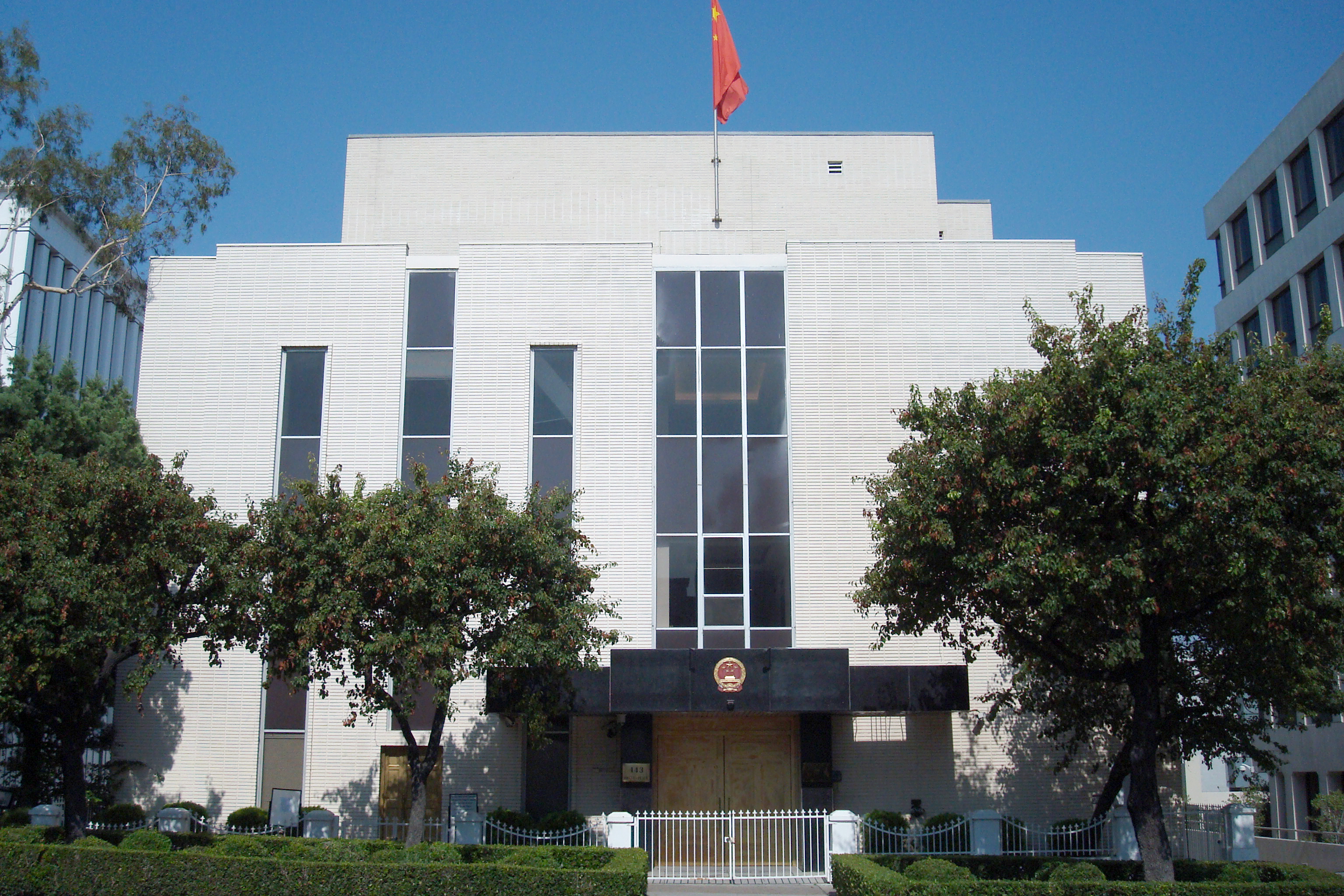
The Chinese consulate in Los Angeles.

According to sinologist Alex Joske, "California was a treasured staging ground for political influence operations and economic espionage. Its extensive united front networks, clusters of advanced technology and undeniable electoral heft make it prime territory for MSS officers. Today, the state holds the honour of having an MSS unit dedicated to influence and intelligence work in it." Silicon Valley is home to multiple united front organizations linked to the PRC government's system of technology transfer.

== Activities ==
San Francisco, with its nearby Silicon Valley, political importance in the Democratic Party, and large contingent of Chinese immigrants, is the centerpiece of operations in California for the MSS. According to US intelligence officials contacted by Politico, "if California is elevated among Chinese interests, San Francisco is like nirvana to the MSS, because of the potential to target community leaders and local politicians who may later become mayors, governors or congressmen." Several suspected MSS officers have been identified operating out of the San Francisco consulate.

=== Cyber espionage ===
In June 2021, the Metropolitan Water District of Southern California, among other organizations, was reported to have been targeted in cyber espionage hacks by a Chinese state-backed advanced persistent threat. In July 2021, a federal grand jury in San Diego indicted four Chinese nationals working with the Hainan State Security Department under the hacking group APT40 who were alleged to conduct a cyber espionage campaign from 2011 to 2018. In March 2024, the United States and United Kingdom jointly indicted and sanctioned members of the Hubei State Security Department for a wide range of cyber operations against critical infrastructure in the two countries, including attacks on a California managed service provider.

In July 2025, the operator of most of California's electric grid, the California Independent System Operator, was reported to have been breached by Chinese state-sponsored hackers due to a zero-day vulnerability in SharePoint which also affected numerous other organizations.

=== Military-related espionage ===
In March 2008, an engineer for L3 Technologies in California, Chi Mak, was sentenced to 24 years for conspiring to send defense technology to China.

In June 2008, Xiaodong Sheldon Meng, an engineer based in Cupertino, was convicted under the Economic Espionage Act of 1996 and sentenced to two years in federal prison for attempting to sell fighter-pilot training software to the People's Liberation Army Navy.

In February 2010, a former Boeing and Rockwell International engineer in Southern California, Dongfan "Greg" Chung was sentenced to 15 years in federal prison for espionage and other charges related passing technology secrets, including from the Space Shuttle program, to China.

In September 2020, a former University of Southern California professor, Hao Zhang, was sentenced to 18 months in federal prison for conspiring to steal and sell smartphone signal technology to the Chinese military.

In August 2023, a former U.S. Navy sailor assigned to the USS Essex in San Diego, Jinchao Wei, was indicted under the Espionage Act of 1917 for passing videos, photos, and manuals of naval weapon systems to a Chinese intelligence officer. In August 2025, Wei was convicted. He was sentenced to more than 16 years in prison.

In January 2024, a former U.S. Navy sailor, Wenheng Zhao, was sentenced in federal court in Southern California to two years for transmitting details about U.S. military operations to a Chinese intelligence officer in exchange for bribes.

In December 2024, federal authorities arrested and charged a Chinese national, Yinpiao Zhou, for clandestinely flying a drone over Vandenberg Space Force Base to take photographs.

In July 2025, the United States Department of Justice charged two Chinese nationals, Yuance Chen and Liren "Ryan" Lai, with attempting to recruit U.S. military personnel and gather naval intelligence for China's Ministry of State Security (MSS). According to the Federal Bureau of Investigation (FBI), Lai, who had ties to an MSS network, began cultivating Chen—then a legal U.S. resident—in 2021 due to his military contacts. The two met with MSS agents abroad and coordinated espionage efforts, including the use of a dead drop in 2022, where they left $10,000 in cash in a California locker to pay individuals for intelligence. Chen later toured the USS Abraham Lincoln in San Diego and collected personal details of Navy personnel, which were allegedly passed to Lai. The Justice Department stated that the operation was part of a broader Chinese effort to expand its "blue-water" naval capabilities and undermine U.S. national security. Both men were charged under the Foreign Agent Registration Act (FARA), which requires individuals acting on behalf of foreign governments to register with U.S. authorities.

In July 2025, a former engineer at a South California company, Chenguang Gong, pleaded guilty to stealing military tracking blueprints for the Chinese government.

=== Technology acquisition ===
==== Jensen Huang and Nvidia ====
On October 29, 2026, The New York Times reported that Jensen Huang, the co-founder and CEO of Nvidia, had been the target of a spy plot involving the government of China, citing people briefed on U.S. intelligence surveillance who spoke on condition of anonymity. Huang had an extramarital affair with Alice Huang (no relation), a Chinese national who was an executive of Megaspeed, a Singaporean company. U.S. officials reportedly suspected that she had been recruited by China's Ministry of State Security as a spy. On November 11, the Times reported, citing five Nvidia employees, that Jensen Huang had also had an extramarital relationship with Kimberly Powell, an executive who reported to him. That same day, Nvidia's board met to discuss his ouster and accepted his resignation, which the company announced the following day.

President Donald Trump was briefed on the intelligence in 2025 and in May 2026, and chose not to act. U.S. officials did not warn Jensen Huang through a defensive briefing. On November 12, Attorney General Todd Blanche said the Justice Department had reached no conclusion about whether Alice Huang was a spy, and CNN reported, citing multiple sources, that the intelligence collected on her did not prove she had acted as one. The next day, the Times reported that multiple people who had reviewed the underlying U.S. intelligence stated that they were confident in their information about her interactions with Chinese intelligence and believed she was an "asset" rather than a trained intelligence officer, and that the investigations were still ongoing. On November 16, Trump said he did not know whether she was a spy.

=== Political intelligence gathering ===
==== Dianne Feinstein ====
According to four former U.S. intelligence officials, in the 2000s, a staffer and Chinese community outreach liaison in Senator Dianne Feinstein's San Francisco field office was providing political intelligence to the MSS. The informant, who was not ultimately charged, was handled by officials working out of China's San Francisco Consulate.

==== Representative Eric Swalwell ====
In December 2020, Swalwell was named in an Axios story about suspected Chinese spy Fang Fang (方芳; Fāng Fāng), known as Christine Fang, who, since at least 2012, had been cultivating contacts with California politicians who the Chinese government believed had promising futures in politics. Axios reported that Fang participated in fundraising for Swalwell's 2014 congressional election bid, met Swalwell at events, and helped place an intern inside his congressional office.

==== Eileen Wang ====
In December 2024, the United States Department of Justice indicted an alleged Chinese spy who attempted to cultivate council member Eileen Wang of Arcadia, California. The alleged spy is Wang's fiancé, Yaoning "Mike" Sun, with whom she has been together since 2018. In October 2025, Yaoning Sun agreed to plead guilty to acting as an illegal agent for the Chinese government, and was sentenced to four years in prison in February 2026. In May 2026 it was announced that Wang had entered into a plea agreement, admitting to charges that she had acted under the control of the People's Republic of China to promote propaganda in the U.S. between 2020 and 2022; the maximum sentence for these charges is 10 years in prison. (She has resigned her position as mayor.)

=== Surveillance and repression of dissidents ===
==== 2008 Olympics ====
In the lead up to the 2008 Summer Olympics, San Francisco hosted a leg of the Olympic torch relay on its way to Beijing. According to three former U.S. intelligence officials, Chinese officials sought to disrupt any potential protest and maintain China's public image by sending MSS and Ministry of Public Security (MPS) officers to join suspected MSS officers embedded in the Bay Area. They reportedly bussed in 6,000–8,000 J-visa Chinese students and orchestrated the movements of counter-protesters, directing them to intimidate and disrupt protesters across the parade route and along the Embarcadero. The spies reportedly filmed Tibetan Buddhist monks on a march across the Golden Gate Bridge, surveilled a pro-Tibetan independence rally, recorded participants at a Falun Gong rally in Union Square as well as Uyghur and other pro-democracy protesters. According to Politico, one U.S. intelligence officer said, "I'm not sure they would have pulled out these stops in any other city, but San Francisco is special" to China.

==== Falun Gong ====
In May 2023, two Los Angeles residents, John Chen and Lin Feng, were charged in federal court as unregistered foreign agents of the People's Republic of China who attempted to manipulate the whistleblower program of the Internal Revenue Service (IRS) against Shen Yun, which is affiliated with Falun Gong, by filing a false complaint with the IRS aimed at stripping Shen Yun of its tax-exempt status. Both were later sentenced for bribing an IRS official to influence the IRS's handling of the complaint.

==== Taiwan ====
In October 2026, U.S. federal authorities arrested and charged a Chinese national with acting an unregistered foreign agent for engaging in covert surveillance of Lai Ching-te's son in the U.S. The national, Wanying Zhang, was employed as a realtor in Irvine, California, used tradecraft to avoid detection, and was arrested at Los Angeles International Airport while attempting to a board a flight to China.

== See also ==
- Chinese espionage in the United States
- List of Chinese spy cases in the United States
- Allegations of intellectual property infringement by China
- Katrina Leung
