= Sherry Chen =

Sherry Chen may refer to:

- Sherry Chen (politician) (born 1955), South African politician
- Sherry Chen (actress) (born 1983), Hong Kong actress
- Sherry Chen (hydrologist), American scientist falsely accused of spying for China
