= Jiang Bo =

Jiang Bo may refer to:

- Jiang Bo (figure skater) (born 1992), Chinese male pair skater
- Jiang Bo (footballer) (born 1982), Chinese footballer
- Bo Jiang (fugitive) (born 1968), businessman on the FDA Most Wanted Fugitives list
- Bo Jiang (NASA researcher), contract researcher for NASA
- Jiang Bo (runner) (born 1977), female Chinese middle-distance runner
