= Wanying Zhang espionage case =

Alleged Chinese espionage case in the United States

In October 2026, the United States Department of Justice charged Wanying "Heather" Zhang (simplified Chinese: 张婉莹; traditional Chinese: 張婉瑩; pinyin: Zhāng Wǎnyíng), a Chinese-American real estate agent in California, and others with having covertly surveilled and photographed Lai Ting-yu (Chinese: 賴廷與), the son of Taiwanese President Lai Ching-te, and his family in a suburb of Seattle, Washington, in September 2025. In the criminal complaint, a Federal Bureau of Investigation (FBI) agent stated that Zhang had acted at the direction of individuals she understood to be officials of the government of the People's Republic of China (PRC), and that the residences, vehicles, and photographs of the president's close relatives could be of use to Beijing should it seek leverage over Taiwan's president in a potential conflict.

On October 4, 2026, Zhang was arrested by federal agents at Los Angeles International Airport as she was preparing to board a flight to Shanghai, China. She was charged with acting as an agent of a foreign government without notifying the United States Attorney General as required by law. She made her initial court appearance on October 5 with the judge ordered her held in custody, and a detention hearing was scheduled for October 7. Karen Kuo, spokesperson for the Presidential Office, condemned the incident as a typical, barbaric act of "transnational repression". Taiwan's Ministry of Foreign Affairs also strongly condemned the incident the same day and called on the international community to adopt countermeasures.

== Background ==
=== Individuals involved ===
Wanying Zhang

The principal accused, Wanying "Heather" Zhang, was 34 years old at the time and lived in Irvine, California. She held a California real estate license and worked for JC Pacific Capital (also known as JC Pacific Corp.), a local real estate brokerage. Zhang was from Changsha in Hunan Province, China and citing a LinkedIn profile reportedly belonging to Zhang, the BBC reported that she had graduated from the University of International Relations in Beijing; Up Media, citing the criminal complaint, reported that U.S. investigators described the university as having close ties to the PRC's Ministry of State Security. Zhang later earned a master's degree in public administration from the University of Southern California, after which she remained in California as a real estate agent, promoting her business with the slogan "Southern California's ten-million-dollar agent". Data from real estate listing platforms show that she had handled more than 100 property transactions. Zhang lives with her husband, Edric Ding, who is also a real estate agent, and two daughters. The family previously owned a home in Irvine valued at approximately US$6 million, which they sold in June 2026 before moving into a rental property in a nearby community. Zhang is a naturalised US citizen.

According to law enforcement sources, the espionage target was Lai Ting-yu, the eldest son of President of Taiwan Lai Ching-te, who was in his 30s at the time. He earned a bachelor's degree in electrical engineering from Case Western Reserve University and a master's degree from Johns Hopkins University, and later received a doctorate in bioengineering from the University of Washington. A long-time resident of the United States, he works as an engineer for the Dutch multinational electronics company Philips and lives in a Seattle suburb with his wife and son.

=== Political context and intelligence gathering ===
President of Taiwan Lai Ching-te, whose son was the target of the espionage, pictured in December 2025

Since taking office as President of Taiwan as a member of the Democratic Progressive Party, Lai Ching-te has maintained that the Republic of China and the People's Republic of China are "not subordinate to each other". Beijing regards Taiwan as Chinese territory, has repeatedly denounced Lai as a "separatist", and has refused to hold official dialogue with his government. In the criminal complaint, the FBI agent assigned to the case wrote that, in pursuit of its political and strategic objectives, the PRC government might, in addition to strengthening its military posture, employ unconventional means to weaken Taiwan's will to resist. The complaint stated that if Beijing could obtain the exact addresses, vehicles, and daily movements of the Taiwanese leader's close relatives, such personal information could be used as leverage to pressure or politically coerce the president should the situation in the Taiwan Strait deteriorate or a conflict break out.

U.S. law enforcement officials also stated that PRC intelligence networks had previously carried out transnational operations targeting Taiwanese politicians and others abroad, and that the case was therefore not the first of its kind. U.S. authorities had previously found that Yaoning "Mike" Sun, acting on Beijing's instructions, had monitored former President Tsai Ing-wen's 2023 transit through Southern California; Sun was later sentenced to four years in prison. Authorities had also uncovered cases involving alleged covert overseas police stations. In addition, Czech military intelligence disclosed that personnel from the Chinese embassy in Prague had attempted in 2024 to follow and surveil Hsiao Bi-khim, then Vice President-elect, illustrating international precedents for such cross-border intelligence and surveillance operations.

== Alleged surveillance ==
=== Contact and planning ===
According to a criminal complaint filed by the FBI's counterintelligence squad in the United States District Court for the Central District of California, beginning in the first half of 2025 Zhang established contact with at least two people she knew to be employees of the PRC government. In January 2025, Zhang met "Chinese Official 1" for the first time; in June of that year, she was introduced to a second official, "Chinese Official 2", through an alumnus of the University of International Relations. She later traveled to Changsha, China, where she booked a private room to meet the official. During the meeting, the official raised a task involving "a house in the United States" and asked Zhang to carry out surveillance. She agreed on the spot and later sent a message saying, "I can handle this." On August 21, Zhang traveled to Hangzhou, China, to meet "Chinese Official 2" again. On August 26, she told the official via the messaging app WeChat that she was working in Los Angeles that week and expected to travel to Seattle the following week; the official replied, "Okay, thanks for your hard work."

=== Surveillance in Seattle ===
CCTV footage showing Zhang and individual "1", at a car rental company in Seattle (September 2025)

According to the complaint, on September 1, 2025, Zhang and a male associate identified as "Individual 1" flew from Las Vegas to Seattle, where they rented a black Nissan Rogue and drove to Lai Ting-yu's residence. The pair arrived near the residence at around 4:50 p.m. and began a stakeout. At around 6:00 p.m., Lai and his family had returned home, and the two allegedly used mobile phones to photograph and film the family. While "Individual 1" was filming, Zhang reclined the front passenger seat to lower her profile and avoid attracting attention.

The complaint states that during the stakeout, Zhang sent real-time updates to "Chinese Official 2" via WeChat, including the messages "Saw him, young male, it's the young one" and "I'm recording", along with two license plate numbers registered to the people under surveillance. The official responded with three "thumbs-up" emoji, and the two also held a voice call during this period. That day, Zhang also sent the official a video of the residence approximately 16 seconds long, in which her associate can be heard saying, "We're here, this is the house," and Zhang can be heard responding. At the official's request, she further reported that two cars were parked in front of the house and that an American flag was hanging there.

=== Tradecraft and evidence ===
Fox43, citing the analysis of FBI Special Agent Kevin Holt in the charging document, reported that the conduct of Zhang and her associate involved several tradecraft techniques commonly used by foreign intelligence officers, including last-minute purchases of short-haul flights between different airports, renting vehicles for only a few hours before promptly returning them and deliberately using vehicles to conceal themselves as a countersurveillance measure. On September 8, 2025, Zhang asked "Individual 1" not to send the Seattle surveillance photos via WeChat or text message but to use AirDrop instead, saying, "I need to send the photos back; he wants me to send them back today." Investigators believe this was intended to evade digital monitoring and minimize traceable electronic records. U.S. law enforcement later obtained evidence of the surveillance and intelligence-gathering operation from security cameras installed by neighbors, as well as from WeChat conversations and photo files in Zhang's Apple iCloud backups, which were obtained under a search warrant.

== Investigation and arrest ==
=== FBI investigation ===
The complaint does not explain how the FBI first learned of the matter, nor whether the targets noticed the surveillance and reported it. The FBI's counterintelligence team subsequently obtained surveillance footage from around the targeted residence. After comparing footage from neighbors' security cameras, CBS News reported that the building shown matched the address of a property owned by Lai Ting-yu in suburban Seattle. Investigators then obtained a search warrant to search and seize the backups of Zhang's Apple iCloud account, from which they recovered complete records of the WeChat communications in which she had relayed real-time updates, photos, and license plate numbers related to the surveillance to at least two PRC officials.

=== Arrest at the airport and search of residence ===
Zhang arrested by FBI agents at Los Angeles International Airport just before boarding her flight to China (4 October 2026)

On October 4, 2026, Zhang went to Los Angeles International Airport intending to fly to Shanghai. Before boarding, she was stopped by FBI agents, arrested, and handcuffed. FBI Director Kash Patel later confirmed the arrest in a post on X, sharing footage of Zhang being escorted in handcuffs. Patel wrote that the United States was no longer a safe place to conduct espionage, said that anyone who surveilled a foreign leader's family on American soil on behalf of the PRC and then tried to fly back to Shanghai would not succeed, and pledged that the FBI would pursue and bring to justice any threat to U.S. national security, wherever it might hide. Early on the morning of the arrest, about ten FBI agents wearing gloves raided the house Zhang was renting in an upscale neighborhood of Irvine, cordoning off areas including the garage to collect and secure evidence.

== Legal proceedings ==
Criminal complaint filed against Zhang by the United States District Court for the Central District of California

Following Zhang's arrest, the U.S. Attorney's Office for the Central District of California brought charges in the U.S. District Court for the Central District of California, accusing her of acting as an agent of a foreign government without notifying the U.S. Attorney General as required. The prosecution is being handled by Assistant U.S. Attorneys Amanda Elbogen and Colin Scott of the Central District of California, with Scott Lara of the Counterintelligence and Export Control Section of the Justice Department's National Security Division also appearing on behalf of the federal government.

On October 5, 2026, Zhang made her initial appearance at the federal courthouse in Downtown Los Angeles. She appeared in court with her wrists handcuffed and her ankles shackled. As proceedings began, her husband, Edric Ding, and an attorney accompanying him waved to her from the public gallery, and Zhang nodded in response; court officers removed her handcuffs before the judge began questioning her. Zhang appeared calm, speaking only to confirm her name and to state that she fully understood the charge against her; she did not enter a plea or make any substantive response to the charge.

Federal public defender Chad Pennington told the court that Zhang intended to retain private counsel. Because her finances and assets did not meet the eligibility requirements for representation by a public defender, presiding U.S. Magistrate Judge Steve Kim ordered her to retain a private defense attorney by the afternoon of October 7, and ordered her remanded to the custody of the United States Marshals Service pending that hearing. The court subsequently set the next formal hearing in the case for October 19, 2026. After the initial appearance, Ding and his sister, attorney Elaine Lori, declined to answer questions from the many reporters present and left quickly. In a public statement, First Assistant U.S. Attorney Bill Essayli of the Central District of California emphasized that, under U.S. law, criminal defendants are presumed innocent unless and until proven guilty in court. On October 7, Kim denied Zhang’s bail after prosecutors successfully argued she was a significant flight risk. The court cited her attempt to fly to Shanghai prior to her arrest, an unrecovered Chinese passport, hundreds of thousands of dollars in Chinese bank accounts, immediate family living in China and inconsistencies in her reported real estate assets. On October 23, Zhang pleaded not guilty in a federal court in Los Angeles to a charge of acting as an unregistered agent of the Chinese government. The court scheduled a pretrial hearing for November 12, 2026 and set the trial to begin on November 30, 2026 at a federal courthouse in Santa Ana, California.

== Reactions ==
=== Taiwan ===
Taiwan Presidential Office spokesperson Karen Kuo described the incident as a typical case of transnational repression, criticizing it as an act that disregarded human rights and the sovereignty of other countries and that sought to achieve its aims by suppressing, threatening, or even harming advocates of freedom and democracy and their families. She also thanked the U.S. judicial authorities. The Ministry of Foreign Affairs strongly condemned the incident, called on the international community to jointly adopt countermeasures, and said it would strengthen intelligence sharing through measures focused on prevention, protection, countermeasures, and cooperation with democratic partners. Premier Cho Jung-tai, speaking to reporters at the Legislative Yuan, said that the PRC's resort to cross-border repression had violated one of the international community's most sensitive taboos. He said that, with acts harmful to human rights having become a reality, neither the government nor society should remain silent, and he urged citizens and civil society groups to remain vigilant and take steps to protect their personal safety.

The Mainland Affairs Council (MAC) stated that transnational repression targeting Taiwanese nationals had affected at least 126 people in 140 instances. It noted that covert surveillance and photography in the United States can constitute a federal felony, whereas Taiwan's laws still contain gaps in this area, and said it was working on amendments to the Anti-Infiltration Act. MAC Minister Chiu Chui-cheng said the government would draw up guidelines for the public explaining how people facing cross-border repression could seek assistance. The ruling Democratic Progressive Party's Department of China Affairs also issued a statement criticizing the Chinese Communist Party for widening the targets of its pressure from dissidents to the family members of a democratically elected head of state, and saying that if Beijing wished to maintain cross-strait exchanges, it should immediately stop what the party described as exporting authoritarian fear.

=== United States ===
Responding to media inquiries on background, a U.S. State Department spokesperson reiterated the U.S. government's commitment to safeguarding national sovereignty and said that the United States would protect individuals within its borders from threats, intimidation, harassment, or transnational coercion by any foreign government or regime.

Roman Rozhavsky, Assistant Director of the FBI's Counterintelligence and Espionage Division, said the case showed the lengths to which China's authoritarian regime would go to achieve its aims, and stressed that the FBI would continue to defend the sovereignty of democratic allies and combat transnational repression by any foreign power within the United States. First Assistant U.S. Attorney Bill Essayli of the Central District of California and John Eisenberg, the Assistant Attorney General for National Security, also stated that the case involved U.S. national security and that the Justice Department and federal law enforcement agencies would remain on high alert. Several Republican senators, including Rick Scott, Pete Ricketts and Marsha Blackburn, posted on social media criticizing Chinese Communist Party infiltration and intelligence-gathering activities in the United States as a serious threat to U.S. national security.

=== People's Republic of China ===
Chinese Ministry of Foreign Affairs spokesperson Guo Jiakun said in press conference that he was not aware of the matter and opposed the hyping of the case as "Chinese espionage".

== See also ==
- Chinese espionage in the United States
  - Chinese espionage in California
  - List of Chinese spy cases in the United States
