= Yanqing Ye =

- Education: National University of Defense Technology (NUDT)
- Occupation: Research scientist

Yanqing Ye is a Chinese national and a researcher who worked at Boston University’s Department of Physics, Chemistry and Biomedical Engineering, from October 2017 to April 2019. She was charged in the US by the FBI on the 28th of January 2020, along with two other individuals, for assisting the Chinese government. She is accused of falsely identifying herself as a student whilst also continuing to work for the People's Liberation Army (PLA), visa fraud, conspiracy and being an agent of a foreign government, while living in the US. She was charged alongside a cancer researcher at Boston (Zaosong Zheng) and a Harvard professor, Charles Lieber.

== Education ==
Ye studied at the National University of Defense Technology (NUDT), in China, which is a military academy. The FBI accuse her of falsely identifying herself as a student at Boston University when she entered the US in October 2017.

== Research ==
Ye's research is around health and computing including data analysis and robotics.
