= Eileen Wang =

Chinese-American politician

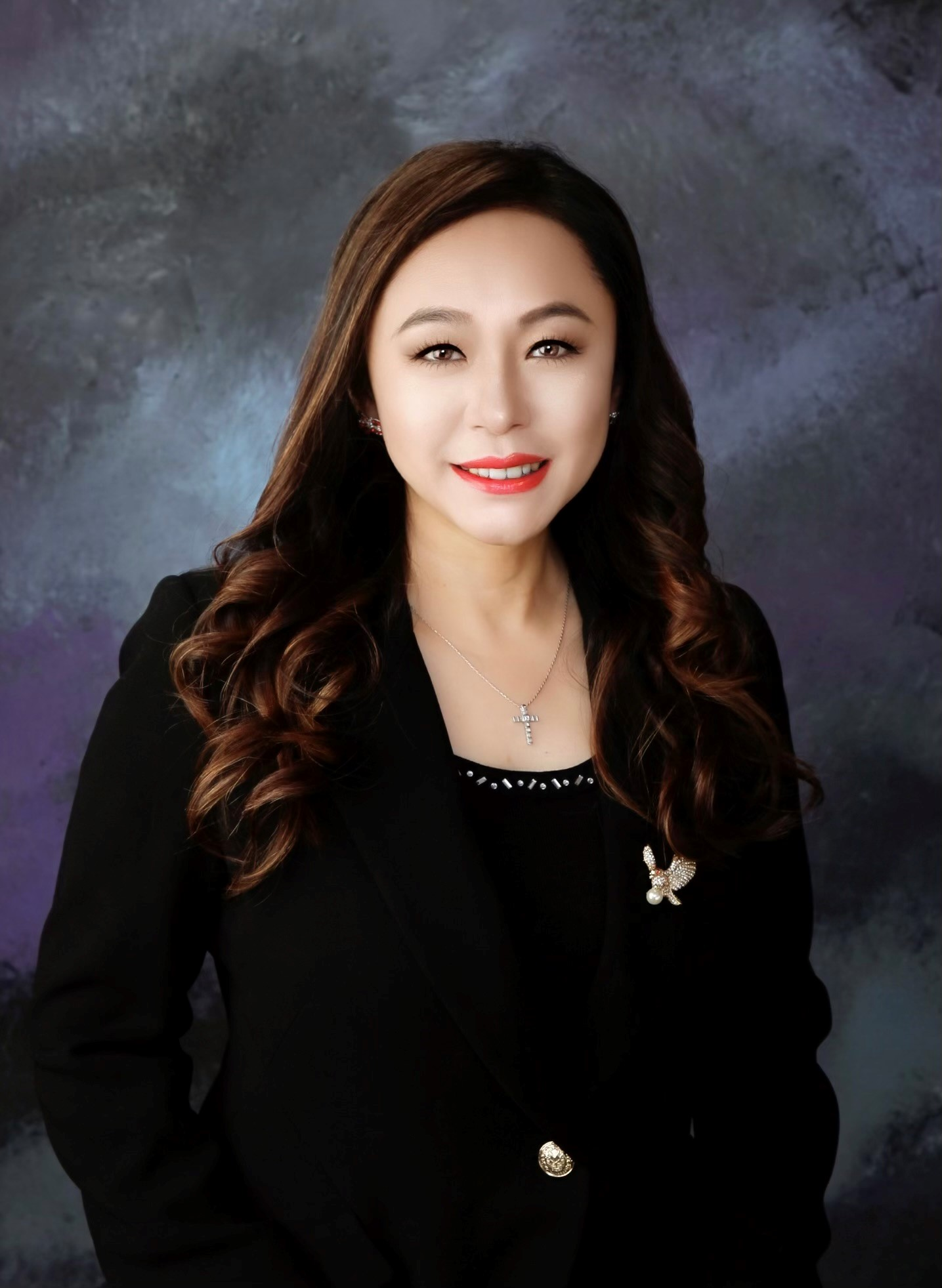

Mayor of Arcadia
- In office February 3, 2026 – May 11, 2026
- Preceded by: Sharon Kwan
- Succeeded by: Paul P. Cheng

Member of the Arcadia City Council from the 3rd district
- In office December 6, 2022 – May 11, 2026
- Succeeded by: Jon Han

Personal details
- Born: 1969 (age 56–57) Chengdu, Sichuan, China
- Party: Republican (before 2022); Democratic (2022–present)
- Children: 2

Eileen Wang (born 1969) is a Chinese-American politician who served as the mayor of Arcadia, California, from February 3 to May 11, 2026, when she resigned from office after pleading guilty to acting as a foreign agent for the People's Republic of China. Wang was elected to the Arcadia City Council on a Democratic Party ticket in November 2022.

== Early life ==
Wang was born in Chengdu, China, in 1969. Wang's father was a physician, who later worked at the University of Southern California, while her mother was an acupuncture doctor. She moved to Arcadia in the early 2000s.

== Career ==
Wang was an educator and community leader who worked with local groups including the Arcadia Lions Club and the Arcadia Association of Realtors. From 2018 to 2022, she was president of the American Southwest Chamber of Commerce USA.

From 2020 to 2022, Wang and her ex-fiancé, Yaoning "Mike" Sun, ran a website called U.S. News Center for the area's Chinese diaspora, which published content favorable to the PRC. In December 2025, Sun was charged by federal prosecutors, on suspicion of operating as an illegal agent for China. According to The Washington Post, Sun was alleged to have knowingly prepared reports that were relayed to an official from China's United Front Work Department, an agency that leverages the Chinese diaspora community to push for Beijing-friendly public policy.

In February 2026, Sun was sentenced to four years in federal prison, after he pleaded guilty.

=== Politics ===
In 2022, Wang ran for the Arcadia city council, relying heavily on canvassing to win the election. Sun served as Wang's campaign manager. Her campaign raised $119,000, and received the endorsements of Hilda Solis, Judy Chu, and Mike Eng. Wang also donated to Chu's campaign. According to campaign finance records, Wang's campaign received $3,300 from the Los Angeles arm of Sing Tao US; Sing Tao US has been registered as a foreign agent in the U.S. since 2021. The group denied making contributions to Wang's campaign, claiming that Wang's campaign finance forms were incorrect.

On December 6, 2022, Wang was sworn in to the Arcadia city council, representing the 3rd district. She claimed to have switched parties in 2022. In December 2024, Wang stated that she usually voted Republican in the past, but instead supported Kamala Harris during the 2024 election.

During 2025, she served as mayor pro tem of Arcadia.

On February 13, 2026, Wang was sworn in as mayor of Arcadia, succeeding outgoing mayor Sharon Kwan.

==== Resignation ====
On May 11, 2026, Wang resigned as mayor of Arcadia. That day, a federal plea agreement was unsealed, revealing that Wang had been criminally charged with and agreed to plead guilty to "one count of acting in the United States as an illegal agent" of China under 18 U.S.C. § 951. She faces a maximum sentence of ten years in prison for the felony count. On May 29, Wang pleaded guilty before Judge Wesley Hsu, and was allowed to remain out on a $25,000 bond; her sentencing is set for October 6, 2026.

On May 19, the Arcadia city council announced that Councilman Paul P. Cheng was appointed to succeed Wang as mayor. The city council also announced plans to interview candidates in June 2026 to fill Wang's District 3 council seat. On June 16, investment manager John Han was sworn into the District 3 council seat, to succeed Wang.

== Personal life ==
Wang has two sons. Wang was previously married to Henry Wang before divorcing on an unknown date. Wang and her ex-fiancé, Yaoning "Mike" Sun, separated in spring 2024.

== Electoral history ==
2022 Arcadia municipal election – 3rd city council district
Party	Candidate	Votes	%
Nonpartisan	Eileen Wang	1,236	64.21%
Nonpartisan	Sheng Chang	689	35.79%

== See also ==
- Alice Guo, a Chinese mayor in the Philippines accused of being a spy for China, since convicted for human trafficking
- Asian Americans in politics
- Chinese espionage in the United States
  - Chinese espionage in California
- List of Chinese Americans
- List of Chinese spy cases in the United States
