= Moo Ko-Suen =

Spy

Ko-Suen Moo
- Occupation: Businessman
- Espionage activity
- Allegiance: People's Republic of China

Ko-Suen "Bill" Moo was a Taiwanese businessman convicted of being a covert agent of the People's Republic of China in May 2006. He attempted to purchase United States military equipment to send back to China but was arrested by undercover United States agents. Some of the equipment Mr. Moo tried to purchase included an F-16 fighter jet engine, an AGM-129A cruise missile, UH-60 Black Hawk helicopter engines, and AIM-120 air-to-air missiles.
