= Sherry Chen (hydrologist) =

Chinese-American hydrologist

- Chinese: 陈霞芬
- Born: Beijing

Sherry Chen (Chinese: 陈霞芬) is an American hydrologist who worked in the National Weather Service (NWS) office in Wilmington, Ohio. She was accused of spying and arrested in October 2014. In March 2015, federal prosecutors dropped all charges against her without explanation before the trial began. Even with the case dropped, Chen was fired from her job in March 2016 for many of the same reasons that she was originally prosecuted for. In October 2016, Chen filed a case of wrongful employment termination to the Merit Systems Protection Board (MSPB). In April 2018, MSPB issued a decision stating that Chen was "a victim of gross injustice" and ordered the Department Of Commerce (NWS is an agency under DOC) to give her job back with back pay. In June 2018, DOC filed an appeal of the MSPB decision, but this has been delayed. In January 2019, with her case in an indefinite limbo, Chen's legal team filed a civil lawsuit against the U.S. government for the malicious prosecution and false arrest in the United States District Court for the Southern District of Ohio. The case was settled on Nov. 10th, 2022. Ms Chen was awarded $550,000 up front, followed by $1.25 million to be paid out by the US government over the next 10 years.

== Background and employment in NWS ==
Sherry Chen is a naturalized U.S. citizen born in Beijing, China. From an early age, she was interested in engineering, especially in the abstract nature of water and air. She earned advanced degrees in Hydrology in Beijing, married and moved to the United States to pursue a graduate degree in Water Resources and Climatology. After graduation, she worked for the Missouri Department of Natural Resources for over 11 years before moving to the Ohio River Forecast Center (OHRFC) of the National Weather Service in March 2007.

Chen's primary work was to develop and implement the Ohio River Community HEC-RAS Model, which was the largest of its kind in the nation at that time. The goal of the computer model is to significantly improve flood prediction for over 2,000 miles along the Ohio River and its tributaries. The modeling effort is a critical part of the joint mission of OHRFC and the U.S. Army Corps of Engineers (USACE).

Her team received the 2011 National Weather Association Larry R. Johnson Special Award for the "development of and operational success with the Ohio River Community HEC-RAS Model during May 2011 Ohio and Mississippi River flooding". Chen worked during a critical period of the record-setting flood event to get the best possible model results to aid the USACE in their operational decision-making process.

== Federal prosecution and case dismissal ==
Chen's case was triggered by her trip to Beijing to visit her elderly parents in 2012. Chen says that one of her relatives had a dispute with local government about a water pipeline and approached Chen for help since Jiao Yong, vice minister at China's Ministry of Water Resources, is Chen's former classmate in Hydrology. Chen met with Jiao for 15 minutes and told him about her relative's complaint. Towards the end of the meeting, Jiao said his office was trying to fund the repairs of China's aging reservoir system and would to know how this may work in the U.S. As a favor, Chen agreed to help.

Once she returned to US, Chen searched the National Inventory of Dams database using a colleague's password he gave to her and sent Jiao some public websites. She also asked the chief of the water management division of the US Army Corps of Engineers (ACE), who said Jiao could talk to her directly. Chen then emailed Jiao to contact this colleague, without following up further herself. Not long after, this colleague reported Chen to the government security agency suggesting that she may be a Chinese spy attempting to gather U.S. Army Corps of Engineers water control manuals.

In June 2013, Chen was interviewed for seven hours in her office by two special agents from the Department of Commerce. Chen says she tried to cooperate and told the agents everything she knew, but they later claimed that Chen was lying to federal investigators because she misremembered when her meeting with Jiao was, stating 2011 rather than 2012.

On October 20, 2014, six FBI agents took Chen away in handcuffs in front of her colleagues. The Department of Justice (DOJ) issued an indictment with a punishment of up to 25 years in jail and $1M in fines. The original charges included accusing Chen of stealing data, intentionally exceeding authorized access to a database and making two false statements to investigators.

Chen's lawyer, Peter R. Zeidenberg, a partner at Arent Fox in Washington, D.C., defended her case. He found fatal flaws in the case and filed three motions pointing out these flaws and requesting that the DOJ have the case dismissed. The prosecutor went back to grand jury to fix the problems and came back with eight charges and added another prosecutor on his team. After extensive interviews of witness including almost all of Chen's coworkers, search of the history of Chen's bank account statements over twenty years since she came to the US, personal and official email accounts, computer activities, the government decided to drop all the charges against Chen in March 2015 without explanation.

== Firing and MSPB verdict ==
The NWS fired her in March 2016 citing many of the same reasons that she was originally prosecuted for. In October 2016, Chen filed a case of wrongful employment termination to Merit Systems Protection Board (MSPB), an independent quasi-judicial agency established in 1979 to protect federal merit systems against partisan political and other prohibited personnel practices and to protect federal employees against abuses by agency management. In Chen's case, the management agency is the Department of Commerce (DOC), which oversees the NWS housed in the National Oceanic and Atmospheric Administration.

MSPB held a public hearing on Chen's case in Cincinnati, Ohio on March 14–15, 2017. After two full days of testimonies, the hearing ended promptly at 4:00 pm on March 15. It was subsequently completed by video conference on March 28. On April 23, 2018, Chief Administrative Judge Michele Schroeder issued her verdict. In her 135-page written decision, the judge agreed that Chen is the "victim of gross injustice". The judge ruled that DOC did not have cause to fire Chen and ordered the agency to reinstate her employment at the National Weather Service and pay her back pay plus benefits. The judge deemed it "inconceivable" in the way the DOC's criminal investigators were selective and biased in producing their investigative reports. The judge also found it "troubling" that, before firing Chen, DOC officials failed to include in the DOC file a dozen sworn declarations from Chen's co-workers that were "clearly relevant" to the termination decision. The judge further criticised DOC officials for "digging their heels in when it came time to support the decision they had made", observing that "Ms. Furgione and Admiral Devany seemed more concerned about being right than doing the right thing."

=== DOC appeal ===
In June 2018, despite the verdict and the lack of new arguments, DOC filed an appeal of the MSPB decision. Chen filed a cross-appeal. The written arguments from both sides were completed on August 28, 2018. The next step is for MSPB to review and decide on the petitions, which require a quorum of at least two members. Unfortunately MSPB had only one member at that time and zero as of February 28, 2019. Three individuals were nominated to MSPB in 2018, but one withdrew and the Senate Republicans refused to confirm the other two until a third member is nominated. The backlog of appeals in MSPB has grown to more than 1,600 cases at the end of 2018.

Chen does not have her job back and has not received back pay owed to her.

== Civil lawsuit ==
On January 18, 2019, Chen's legal team filed a civil lawsuit against the U.S. government for the malicious prosecution and false arrest of Chen in the United States District Court for the Southern District of Ohio.

On November 10, 2022, Chen's attorneys announced a settlement in two lawsuits. Chen is to receive $550,000 from the Commerce Department and $1.25 million from the U.S. government over 10 years. In addition the Commerce Department will host a private meeting between Chen and a senior National Oceanic and Atmospheric Administration official to discuss wrongdoing at several levels of the agency and anti-discrimination reforms. The Commerce Department will also provide Chen with an acknowledgment of her extensive accomplishments in her years of service as a government hydrologist.
