= Bo Jiang (NASA researcher) =

Suspected Chinese spy

Bo Jiang, a contract researcher working on "source code for high technology imaging" at NASA's Langley Research Center, was arrested under a charge of lying to federal officer on March 16, 2013 at Dulles International Airport on his planned one-way journey to return to China. He was accused of espionage by Representative Frank Wolf, and was investigated for possible violations of the Arms Export Control Act. An affidavit claimed that on a prior occasion, Jiang had taken a NASA laptop containing sensitive information to China.

Jiang was released on May 2, 2013, after a plea agreement in which he admitted guilt to a single charge of misuse of Federal office equipment to download copyrighted movies, television shows and pornography.

== Arrest and plea bargain ==
On March 28, 2013, a U.S. Judge ordered Jiang released after a federal prosecutor acknowledged there was no evidence that he possessed any sensitive, secret or classified material. Jiang's lawyer said congressman Wolf was making his client a "scapegoat" and the subject of witch hunt.

On May 2, 2013, prosecutors dropped a felony charge of lying to federal investigators. Jiang pleaded guilty to a single misdemeanor count of misusing government office equipment and was sentenced to time served - about seven weeks. In his plea agreement, Jiang acknowledged violating a NASA regulation governing use of government office equipment by downloading copyrighted movies, television shows and sexually explicit images on the NASA-owned laptop.

Two Langley Research Center supervisors were indicted for allowing Jiang access to files on the NASA computer system. However no evidence of espionage was ever presented. One of the NASA supervisors was fined $250 and sentenced to six months probation; the second was released with no penalty.
