= Chinese espionage in Hawaii =

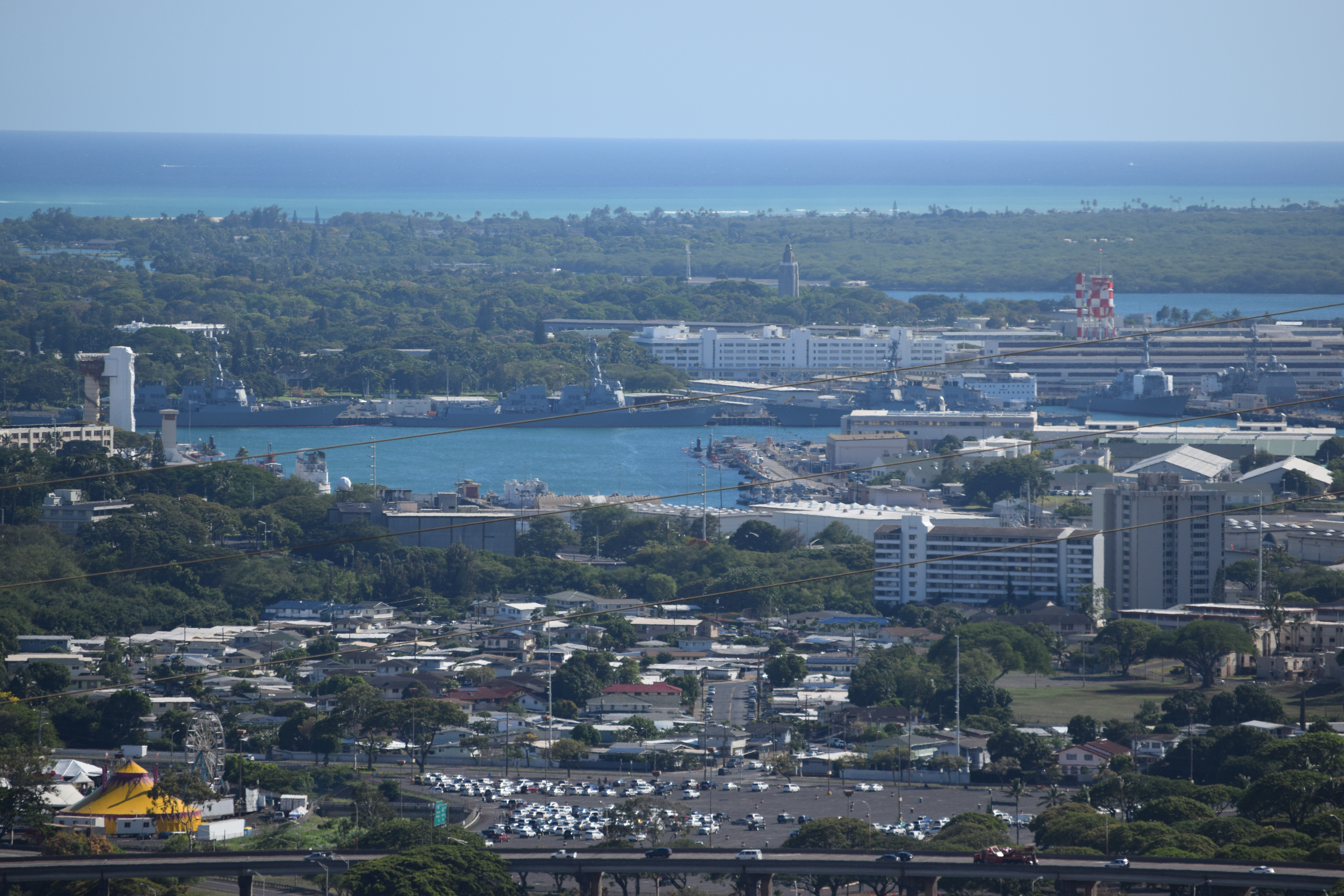
Joint Base Pearl Harbor–Hickam, a key U.S. military installation in the Pacific and a target of Chinese intelligence in Hawaii.

Hawaii is one of the targets of the People's Republic of China's intelligence gathering in the United States. The state hosts a large U.S. military presence in the Pacific Ocean. Chinese intelligence activities have included reconnaissance by sea, air, and space, traditional forms of espionage, as well as cyberwarfare and information operations.

== Military significance ==
The geostrategic and military importance of Hawaii due to its location in the Pacific has been recognized by American diplomats and heads of state for well over a century. Hawaii hosts key commands from all branches of the United States Armed Forces, including United States Army Pacific, United States Marine Corps Forces, Pacific, United States Pacific Fleet, Pacific Air Forces, and United States Space Forces – Indo-Pacific, all of which report to United States Indo-Pacific Command. It serves as the forward edge of their operations in the Indo-Pacific. The National Security Agency's Hawaii Cryptologic Center also serves important functions for military intelligence.

== Chinese activities ==
=== Reconnaissance ===
China has conducted apparent technical collection by sea, air, and space. The U.S. Navy has confirmed several instances of spy ships of the Chinese PLA Navy loitering off the Hawaiian coastline. In 2014, the Chinese spy ship Beijixing was reported in waters close to Hawaii during the RIMPAC military exercises. In 2018, another Chinese Type 815 spy ship was reported nearby during RIMPAC.

In 2023, a high altitude spy balloon launched from central China overflew Hawaii on a mission to collect intelligence on U.S. military bases in Hawaii and Guam when it blew off course, causing an international incident which culminated in the balloon being shot down by the United States Air Force.

In January 2023, the Japanese government's Subaru Telescope, located at Mauna Kea Observatory in Hawaii, identified China's Daqi-1 satellite scanning the Big Island with a laser instrument which can be used for precision topographical mapping.

=== Espionage ===
In 2011, a federal court in Hawaii sentenced Noshir Gowadia, an engineer who helped to design the Northrop B-2 Spirit, to 32 years in prison for selling classified information about the stealth bomber to the Chinese government.

In 2014, a retired U.S. Army lieutenant colonel at Pacific Command, Benjamin Pierce Bishop, was sentenced to seven years in prison for illegally passing classified national defense information to a Chinese intelligence asset with whom he was romantically involved.

In 2019, Assistant General Attorney for National Security John Demers publicly warned of China's industrial espionage against the island after meeting with Hawaiian officials as part of the program known as the China Initiative.

In 2024, Alexander Yuk Ching Ma, a former CIA Operations Officer and FBI Honolulu Field Office translator who resided on Oahu, was sentenced to ten years in federal prison for serving as a mole for China's Ministry of State Security (MSS).

Chinese human intelligence also includes so-called "gate crashers", individuals who claim to be tourists but "accidentally" wander into or photograph sensitive facilities have also been present on the island. Such incidents follow national trends and appear to be a fixture of amateurish Chinese intelligence operations in the contiguous United States as well.

=== Cyberspace ===
In 2019 the University of Hawaiʻi's Applied Research Laboratory was targeted in a successful cyberattack by the hacking group APT40 linked to the Hainan State Security Department. Analysts believe that the hackers were interested in military technologies such as firing antiship missiles from a submarine underwater, undersea acoustic communications, and raw data of projects sponsored by the U.S. government.

In September 2023, the Chinese government launched an online disinformation operation targeting Hawaiian locals, attempting to convince them that a secret U.S. government "weather weapon" had sparked the 2023 wildfires in Lahaina.

In 2023, Volt Typhoon, an advanced persistent threat attributed to China's People's Liberation Army Cyberspace Force, reportedly penetrated the systems of a Hawaiian water utility company. Analysts have stated that such cyberattacks against critical infrastructure can facilitate future sabotage in the event of a military conflict between China and the U.S. in the Western Pacific.

== See also ==
- Chinese intelligence activity abroad
- List of Chinese spy cases in the United States
- Chinese espionage in California
