= DAQI =

DAQI may refer to

- Daily Air Quality Index
- Daqi-1, a Chinese satellite
