= Flag of Duluth, Minnesota =

The flag of Duluth, Minnesota, consists of three main sections: a lighter blue that takes up the upper half, a dark green that takes up a quarter below that, and a darker blue in the bottom quarter. Between the blues and green there are two parallel wavy white lines; each has four valleys and three peaks. An eight-pointed gold star in the sky blue is situated above the first and second peaks in the white lines. Portions of the flag symbolize the sky, the North Woods, Lake Superior, snowy winter, three hills in Duluth, and the North Star.

An earlier city flag was adopted in 1979, but had fallen out of use by the 2010s. A flag contest was held in 2019 to update the city flag; a design by Blane Tetreault was picked from 195 submissions from 98 artists as the winner. Approved by Duluth's city council in 2019 and 2020, it was first flown in 2021. In a 2022 North American Vexillological Association (NAVA) survey, the flag received an A grade and was rated in the top 25 of over 300 flags introduced since 2015.

== Design ==
=== 1979 flag ===
The 1979 flag of Duluth had a green background bisected vertically and horizontally by blue stripes, each of which was surrounded by thin white stripes. The green, white and blue represented Duluth's woods, snow and streams. The cross alluded to the Nordic cross of Scandinavian flags because a large portion of Duluth's population has Scandinavian heritage.

A blue fleur-de-lis outlined in white was located in the upper left and lower right green quadrants, which were a nod to Daniel Greysolon, Sieur du Lhut, the French explorer for whom the city was named.

The city seal was in the center.

=== Current flag ===
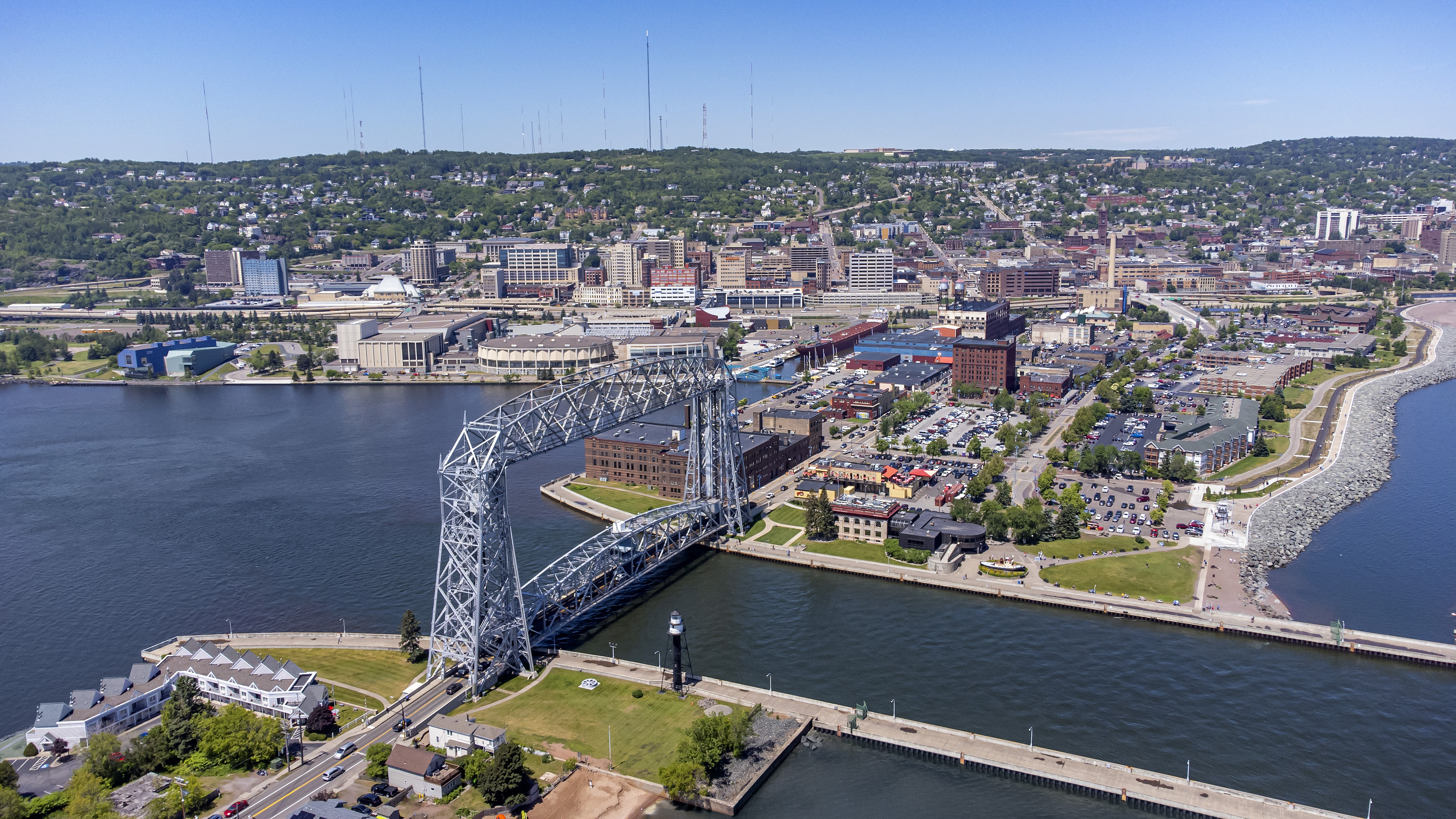
Photo of Duluth showing a lighter blue sky, a darker blue Lake Superior, and some green of the woods in between, each of which demonstrates an element of the flag's color symbolism

The 2019 flag of Duluth has a 3:5 ratio. It consists of a lighter blue that takes up the upper half, a dark green that takes up a quarter below that, and a darker blue in the bottom quarter. The upper lighter blue represents the clear blue of the sky, lower darker blue which represents refreshing water of Lake Superior, and middle dark green which represents the deep green of the North Woods.

Between the blues and green are two narrower parallel wavy white lines (fimbriations); each has four valleys and three peaks. The white represents the snowy winters. The three peaks in the white lines represent Thompson Hill, Enger Hill, and Hawk's Ridge.

An eight-pointed gold star is in the sky blue above the first and second peaks in the white lines; the star symbolizes Duluth as the Zenith City of the North (referring to one of Duluth's nicknames) and the North Star, and it reflects the Native American and voyageur history of the area.

The flag has a resemblance to the proposed 1989 Minnesota state flag called the North Star Flag.

== History ==
=== 1979 flag ===
Flag of Duluth, Minnesota

Duluth's first flag was adopted by the city council in 1979, but its designer is unknown.

The 1979 flag was seen as not meeting modern flag design principles, (Note: The five key principles: Keep it simple; use meaningful symbolism; use two or three basic colors; no lettering or seals; be distinctive or be related. These are general guidelines, and a flag may violate one or two of these principles with a good enough reason.) largely regarding the city seal in the center. Podcaster Roman Mars said vexillologists deride flags with a seal as "SOBs", or "seals on bedsheets", because seals were designed for pieces of paper. The community also provided feedback that it was not an inclusive symbol for all residents.

The flag was not widely used. By 2018 the local news were aware of only two: one in the mayor's office and one in the city council chambers.

=== Current flag ===
In 2016 Duluth adopted a long-range planning vision called Imagine 2035. One of Imagine 2035's "big ideas" was to update the city flag because many in Duluth weren't aware there was a city flag.

Mayor Emily Larson claimed a great flag would make a strong brand for the city, representing the city to its people and its people to the world. She said one of Duluth's strengths is its unique neighborhoods, but a common flag would also improve the sense of unity of residents, and she noted city flags were a part of a resurgence of city pride around the country.

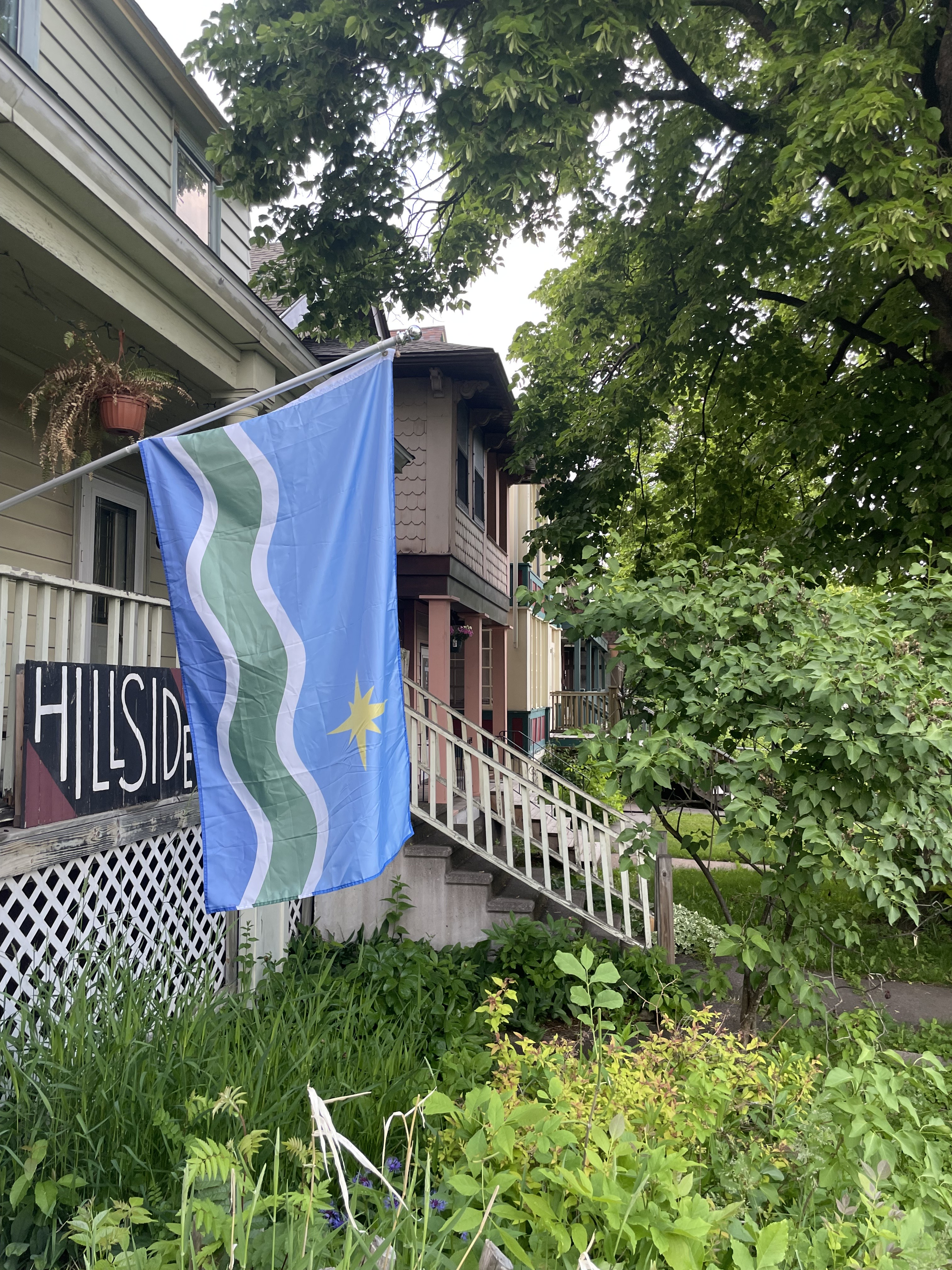
Photo of the Duluth flag hanging backwards in front of a house

In January 2019 the community was invited to participate in an open competition to design the flag. There were 98 artists who entered from Duluth, the state of Minnesota, the US, and around the world. A committee narrowed the 195 entries down to 41 semifinalists and then to 9 finalists. The committee and Mayor Larson recommended the flag to the city council based on design, public feedback and public polling. Two of the nine finalists were accused of plagiarism. The winning flag was designed by Blane Tetreault, with help from his wife, Bridget Tetreault, and their daughters, 11-year-old Amelia and 9-year-old Eleanor.

The flag was approved by the city council in 2019 and released in the public domain. After the public expressed concerns that the council's flag statement was not inclusive to all people, the Duluth NAACP helped rewrite the flag statement and the city council approved it again in 2020.

The flag was first flown at city hall on June 21, 2021.

In a 2022 NAVA survey, the flag received an A grade and was rated in the top 25 of over 300 flags introduced since 2015.
