= Regiment of the North Pole =

The Regiment of the North Pole, also known as the Regiment for the North Star, is a medieval astronomy term for a set of rules describing how to find the celestial North Pole according to the position of the pole star Polaris and the "guard" stars β Ursae Minoris and γ Ursae Minoris. It was used during the Age of Discovery when, because of precession, Polaris was much further from the celestial North Pole than it is now.

The Regiment was developed by Portuguese and Spanish navigators around the mid-fifteenth century. It described the precise number of degrees (ranging from 0.5° to 3.5°) that needed to be added or subtracted from the observed altitude of Polaris in order to get the location of the North Pole. The exact value was dependent on the relative positions of the guard stars to Polaris.

In the late fifteenth century, the knowledge spread to French, English, and Dutch navigators through translations of Portuguese and Spanish manuals despite efforts by Portugal and Spain to suppress their distribution.
