= Polaris =

Northern pole-star; brightest star in Ursa Minor

- Location of Polaris (circled)

Observation data Epoch J2000 Equinox ICRS
- Constellation: Ursa Minor
- Pronunciation: /pəˈlɛərɪs, -ˈlær-/; UK: /pəˈlɑːrɪs/
- α UMi A
- Right ascension: 02^{h} 31^{m} 49.09^{s}
- Declination: +89° 15′ 50.8″
- Apparent magnitude (V): 1.98 (1.86–2.13)
- α UMi B
- Right ascension: 02^{h} 30^{m} 41.63^{s}
- Declination: +89° 15′ 38.1″
- Apparent magnitude (V): 8.7

Characteristics

α UMi A
- Spectral type: F7Ib + F6V
- U−B color index: 0.38
- B−V color index: 0.60
- Variable type: Classical Cepheid

α UMi B
- Spectral type: F3V
- U−B color index: 0.01
- B−V color index: 0.42
- Variable type: suspected

Astrometry
Radial velocity (R_{v})	−17 km/s
Proper motion (μ)	RA: 44.48±0.11 mas/yr Dec.: −11.85±0.13 mas/yr
Parallax (π)	7.54±0.11 mas
Distance	446.5±1.1 ly (136.90±0.34 pc)
Absolute magnitude (M_{V})	−3.6 (α UMi Aa); 3.6 (α UMi Ab); 3.1 (α UMi B)

Position (relative to α UMi Aa)
Component	α UMi Ab
Epoch of observation	2005.5880
Angular distance	0.172″
Position angle	231.4°

Position (relative to α UMi Aa)
Component	α UMi B
Epoch of observation	2005.5880
Angular distance	18.217″
Position angle	230.540°

Orbit
Primary	α UMi Aa
Secondary	α UMi Ab
Period (P)	29.416±0.028 yr
Semi-major axis (a)	0.12955±0.00205" (≥2.90±0.03 AU)
Eccentricity (e)	0.6354±0.0066
Inclination (i)	127.57±1.22°
Longitude of the node (Ω)	201.28±1.18°
Periastron epoch (T)	2016.831±0.044
Argument of periastron (ω) (primary)	304.54±0.84°
Semi-amplitude (K_{1}) (primary)	3.762±0.025 km/s

Details

α UMi Aa
Mass	5.13±0.28 M_{☉}
Radius	46.27±0.42 R_{☉}
Luminosity (bolometric)	1,260 L_{☉}
Surface gravity (log g)	2.2 cgs
Temperature	6015 K
Metallicity	112% solar
Rotation	100.29±0.19 days
Rotational velocity (v sin i)	<13.5 km/s
Age	45–67? Myr

α UMi Ab
Mass	1.316 M_{☉}
Radius	1.04 R_{☉}
Luminosity (bolometric)	3 L_{☉}
Age	>500? Myr

α UMi B
Mass	1.39 M_{☉}
Radius	1.38 R_{☉}
Luminosity (bolometric)	3.9 L_{☉}
Surface gravity (log g)	4.3 cgs
Temperature	6900 K
Rotational velocity (v sin i)	110 km/s
Age	1.5? Gyr

Other designations
- Polaris, North Star, Cynosura, Alpha UMi, α UMi, ADS 1477, CCDM J02319+8915
- α UMi A: 1 Ursae Minoris, BD+88°8, FK5 907, GC 2243, HD 8890, HIP 11767, HR 424, SAO 308
- α UMi B: NSV 631, BD+88°7, GC 2226, SAO 305

Database references
SIMBAD	α UMi A
- α UMi B

Polaris is a yellow supergiant star in the northern circumpolar constellation of Ursa Minor. It is designated α Ursae Minoris (Latinized to Alpha Ursae Minoris) and is commonly called the North Star. With an apparent magnitude that fluctuates around 1.98, it is the brightest star in the constellation and is readily visible to the naked eye at night. The position of the star lies less than 1° away from the north celestial pole, making it the current northern pole star. The stable position of the star in the Northern Sky makes it useful for navigation.

Although appearing to the naked eye as a single point of light, Polaris is a triple star system, composed of the primary, a yellow supergiant designated Polaris Aa, in orbit with a smaller companion, Polaris Ab; the pair is almost certainly in a wider orbit with the third star, Polaris B. The outer companion B was discovered in August 1779 by William Herschel, with the inner Aa/Ab pair only confirmed in the early 20th century.

As the closest Cepheid variable, Polaris Aa's distance is a foundational part of the cosmic distance ladder. The revised Hipparcos stellar parallax gives a distance to Polaris A of about 432 light-years (ly) (133 parsecs (pc)), while the successor mission Gaia gives a distance of 446.5 ly (136.9 pc) for Polaris B. (Note: If A and B are a physical pair, then they share the same parallax; see #Distance)

== Stellar system ==
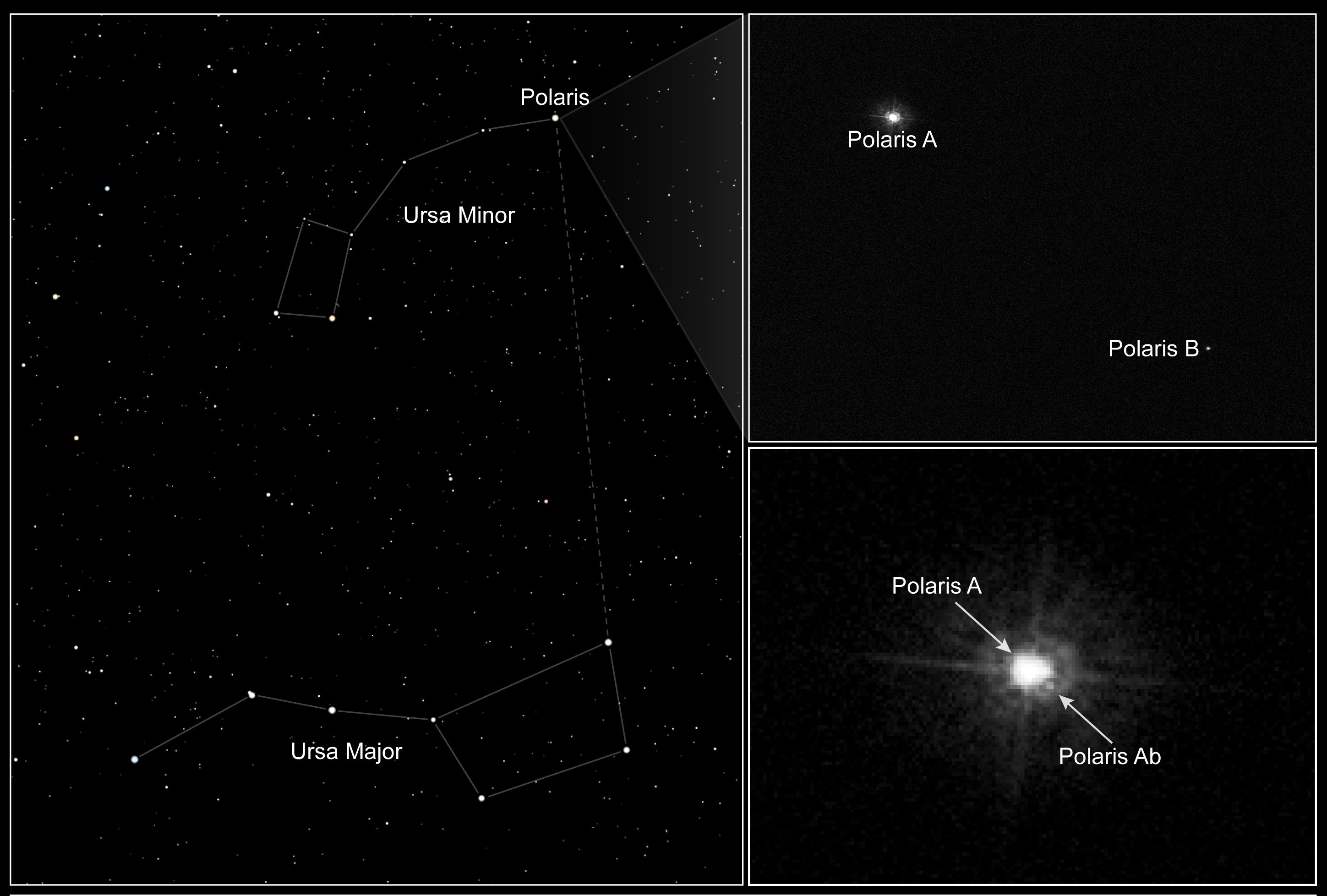
Polaris components as seen by the Hubble Space Telescope

Polaris Aa is an evolved yellow supergiant of spectral type F7Ib with 5.4 solar masses (M_{☉}). It is the first classical Cepheid to have a mass determined from its orbit. The two smaller companions are Polaris B, a 1.39 M_{☉} F3 main-sequence star orbiting at a distance of 2,400 astronomical units (AU), and Polaris Ab (or P), a very close F6 main-sequence star with a mass of 1.26 M_{☉}. In January 2006, NASA released images, from the Hubble telescope, that showed the three members of the Polaris ternary system.

Polaris B can be resolved with a modest telescope. William Herschel discovered the star in August 1779 using a reflecting telescope of his own, one of the best telescopes of the time.

The variable radial velocity of Polaris A was reported by W. W. Campbell in 1899, which suggested this star is a binary system. Since Polaris A is a known cepheid variable, J. H. Moore in 1927 demonstrated that the changes in velocity along the line of sight were due to a combination of the four-day pulsation period combined with a much longer orbital period and a large eccentricity of around 0.6. Moore published preliminary orbital elements of the system in 1929, giving an orbital period of about 29.7 years with an eccentricity of 0.63. This period was confirmed by proper motion studies performed by B. P. Gerasimovič in 1939.

As part of her doctoral thesis, in 1955 E. Roemer used radial velocity data to derive an orbital period of 30.46 y for the Polaris A system, with an eccentricity of 0.64. K. W. Kamper in 1996 produced refined elements with a period of 29.59±0.02 years and an eccentricity of 0.608±0.005. In 2019, a study by R. I. Anderson gave a period of 29.32±0.11 years with an eccentricity of 0.620±0.008.

There were once thought to be two more widely separated components—Polaris C and Polaris D—but these have been shown not to be physically associated with the Polaris system.

== Observation ==
=== Variability ===
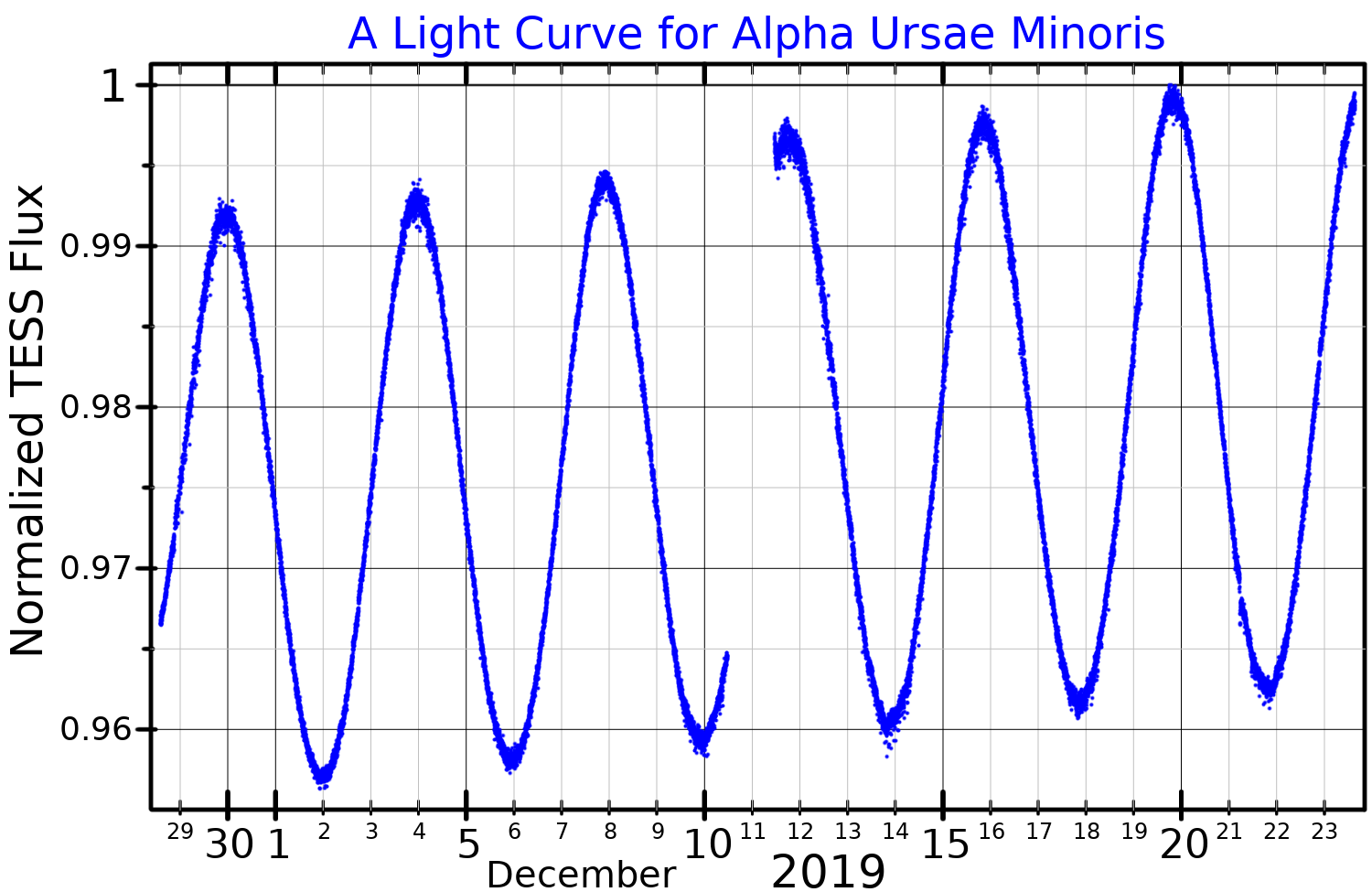
A light curve for Polaris, plotted from TESS data

Polaris Aa, the supergiant primary component, is a low-amplitude population I classical Cepheid variable, although it was once thought to be a type II Cepheid due to its high galactic latitude. Cepheids constitute an important standard candle for determining distance, so Polaris, as the closest such star, is heavily studied. The variability of Polaris had been suspected since 1852; this variation was confirmed by Ejnar Hertzsprung in 1911.

The range of brightness of Polaris is given as 1.86–2.13, but the amplitude has changed since discovery. Prior to 1963, the amplitude was over 0.1 magnitude and was very gradually decreasing. After 1966, it very rapidly decreased until it was less than 0.05 magnitude; since then, it has erratically varied near that range. It has been reported that the amplitude is now increasing again, a reversal not seen in any other Cepheid.

The period, roughly 4 days, has also changed over time. It has steadily increased by around 4.5 seconds per year except for a hiatus in 1963–1965. This was originally thought to be due to secular redward evolution across the Cepheid instability strip, but it may be due to interference between the primary and the first-overtone pulsation modes. Authors disagree on whether Polaris is a fundamental or first-overtone pulsator and on whether it is crossing the instability strip for the first time or not.

The temperature of Polaris varies by only a small amount during its pulsations, but the amplitude of this variation is variable and unpredictable. The erratic changes of temperature and the amplitude of temperature changes during each cycle, from less than 50 K to at least 170 K, may be related to the orbit with Polaris Ab.

A 4-day time lapse of Polaris illustrating its Cepheid-type variability

Research reported in Science suggests that Polaris is 2.5 times brighter today than when Ptolemy observed it, changing from third to second magnitude. Astronomer Edward Guinan considers this to be a remarkable change and is on record as saying that "if they are real, these changes are 100 times larger than [those] predicted by current theories of stellar evolution".

Torres (2023) published a broad historical compilation of radial velocity and photometric data. He concludes that the change in the Cepheid period has reversed and is now decreasing since roughly 2010. Torres notes that TESS data is of limited utility: as a survey telescope, TESS is optimized for dimmer stars than Polaris, so Polaris significantly over-saturates TESS's cameras. Determining an accurate total brightness for Polaris from TESS is extremely difficult, although it remains suitable for timing the period.

Furthermore, apparent irregularities in Polaris Aa's behavior may coincide with the periastron passage of Ab, although imprecision in the data prevents a definitive conclusion. At the Gaia distance, the Aa-Ab closest approach is 6.2 AU; the radius of the primary supergiant is 46 R_{☉}, meaning that the periastron separation is about 29 times its radius. This implies tidal forcing upon Aa's upper atmosphere by Ab. Such binary tidal forcing is known from heartbeat stars, where eccentric periastron approaches cause rich multimode pulsation akin to an electrocardiogram.

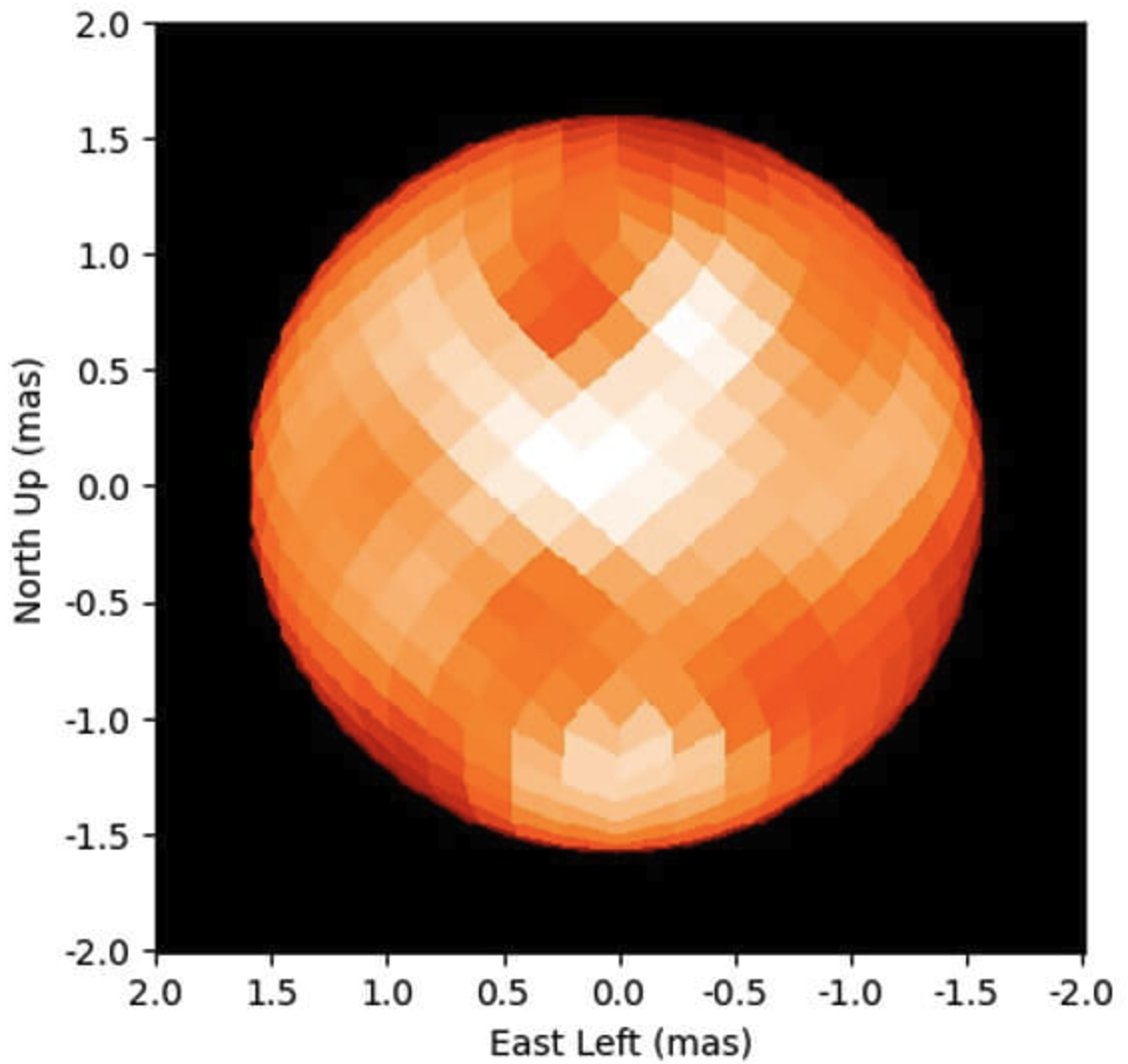
Polaris mapped by the CHARA array

Szabados 1992 suggests that, among Cepheids, "phase slips" similar to what happened to Polaris in the mid 1960s are associated with binary systems.

In 2024, researchers led by Nancy Evans at the Harvard & Smithsonian published a study with fresh data on the inner binary using the interferometric CHARA Array. They improved the solution of the orbit: combining CHARA data with previous Hubble data, and in tandem with the Gaia distance of 446±1 light-years, they confirmed the Cepheid radius estimate of 46 R_{☉} and re-determined its mass at 5.13±0.28 M_{☉}. The corresponding Polaris Ab mass is 1.316±0.028 M_{☉}. Polaris remains overluminous compared to the best Cepheid evolution models, something also seen in V1334 Cygni. Polaris's rapid period change and pulsation amplitude variations are still peculiar compared to other Cepheids, but may be related to the first-overtone pulsations.

Evans et al. also tentatively succeeded in imaging features on the surface of Polaris Aa: large bright and dark patches appear in close-up images, changing over time. Follow up imaging campaigns are required to confirm this detection. Polaris's age is difficult to model; current best estimates find the Cepheid to be much younger than the two main sequence components, seemingly enough to exclude a common origin, which would be quite unlikely for a triple star system.

Torres (2023) and Evans et al. (2024) both suggest that recent literature cautiously agree that Polaris is a first overtone pulsator.

=== Role as pole star ===
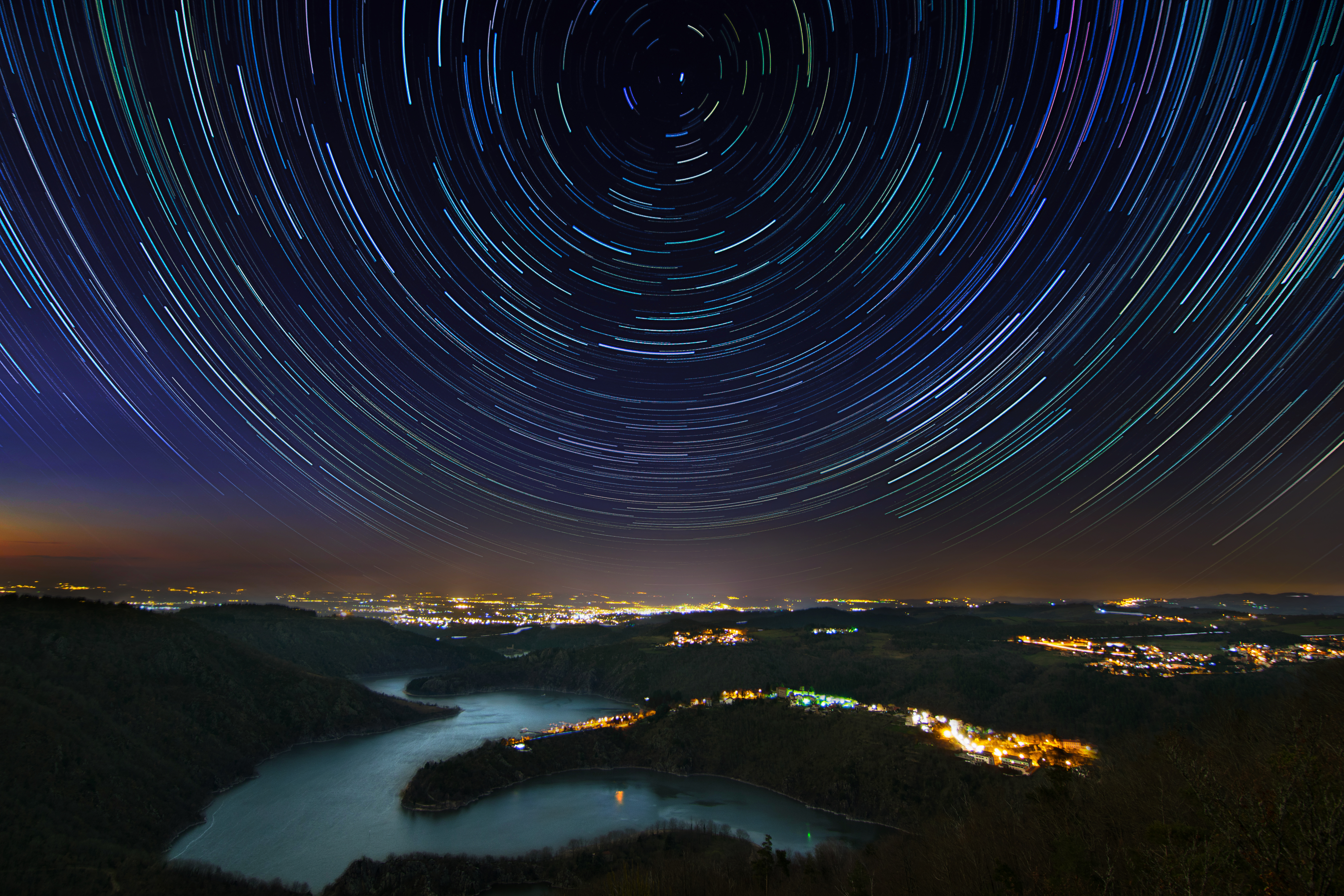
A typical star trail photograph taken in the Northern Hemisphere, with Polaris in the center

Because Polaris lies nearly in a direct line with the Earth's rotational axis above the North Pole, it stands almost motionless in the sky, and all the stars of the northern sky appear to rotate around it. It thus provides a nearly fixed point from which to draw measurements for celestial navigation and for astrometry. The elevation of the star above the horizon gives the approximate latitude of the observer. The star is often popularly believed to be the brightest star in the night sky, though this is not the case; the star's apparent magnitude of around 1.98 places it at only the 47th brightest star.

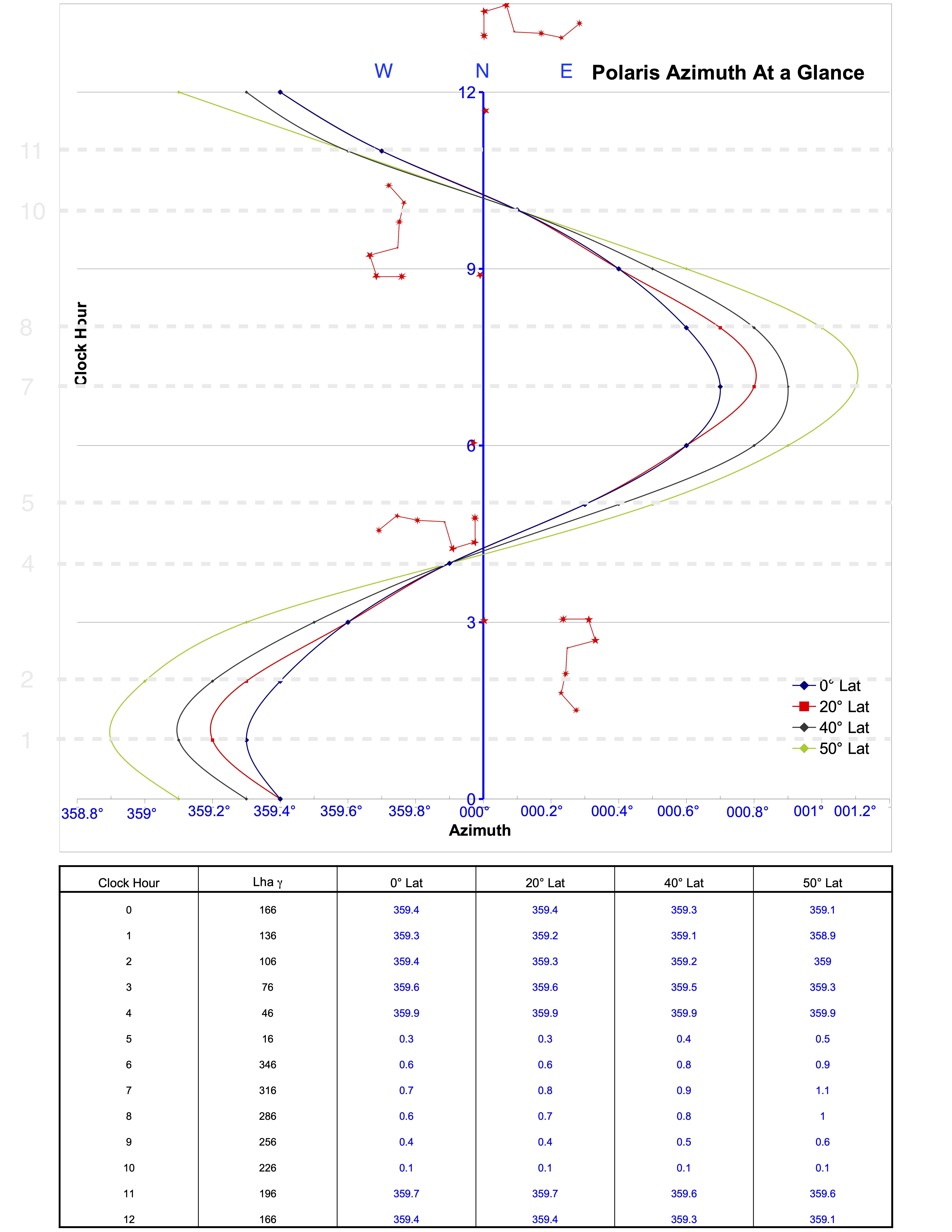
Polaris azimuths vis clock face analogy.

In 2018 Polaris was 0.66° (39.6 arcminutes) away from the pole of rotation (1.4 times the Moon disc) and so revolves around the pole in a small circle 1.3° in diameter. It will be closest to the pole (about 0.45 degree, or 27 arcminutes) soon after the year 2100. Because it is so close to the celestial north pole, its right ascension is changing rapidly due to the precession of Earth's axis, going from 2.5h in AD 2000 to 6h in AD 2100. Twice in each sidereal day Polaris's azimuth is true north; the rest of the time it is displaced eastward or westward, and the bearing must be corrected using tables or a rule of thumb. The best approximation is made using the leading edge of the "Big Dipper" asterism in the constellation Ursa Major. The leading edge (defined by the stars Dubhe and Merak) is referenced to a clock face, and the true azimuth of Polaris worked out for different latitudes.

The apparent motion of Polaris towards and, in the future, away from the celestial pole, is due to the precession of the equinoxes. The north celestial pole precesses in a circle over thousands of years; Polaris will be closest to the celestial pole by approximately 2100 AD, after which time the pole will begin to move away. It will pass by the star Errai (Gamma Cephei) in 4000 AD, Deneb in 10,000 AD, and Vega in 14,500 AD. The celestial pole will once again return to Polaris after a complete precession taking 26,000 years.

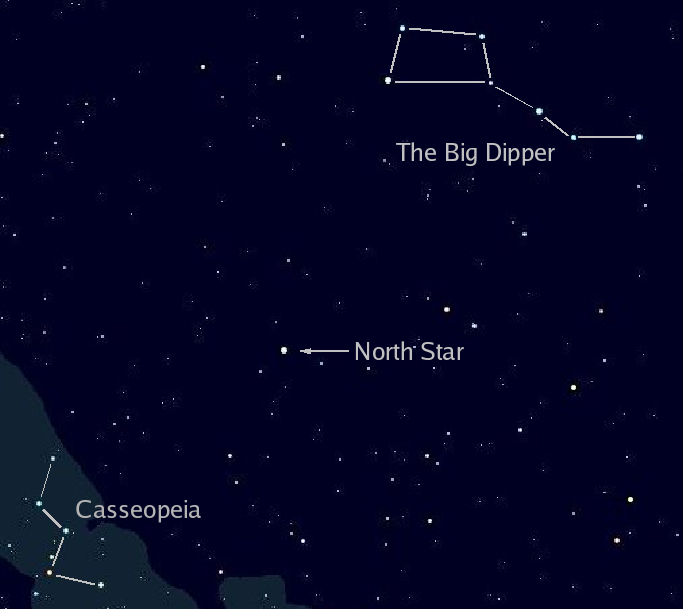
Polaris lying halfway between the asterisms Cassiopeia and the Big Dipper

The celestial pole was close to Thuban around 2750 BC, and during classical antiquity it was slightly closer to Kochab (β UMi) than to Polaris, although still about 10° from either star. It was about the same angular distance from β UMi as to α UMi by the end of late antiquity. The Greek navigator Pytheas in ca. 320 BC described the celestial pole as devoid of stars. However, as one of the brighter stars close to the celestial pole, Polaris was used for navigation at least from late antiquity, and described as ἀεί φανής (aei phanēs) "always visible" by Stobaeus (5th century), also termed Λύχνος (Lychnos) akin to a burner or lamp and would reasonably be described as stella polaris from about the High Middle Ages and onwards, both in Greek and Latin. On his first trans-Atlantic voyage in 1492, Christopher Columbus had to correct for the "circle described by the pole star about the pole". In Shakespeare's play Julius Caesar, written around 1599, Caesar describes himself as being "as constant as the northern star", although in Caesar's time there was no constant northern star.

Polaris was referenced in the classic Nathaniel Bowditch maritime navigation book American Practical Navigator (1802), where it is listed as one of the navigational stars.

== Distance ==
Since Leavitt's discovery of the Cepheid variable period-luminosity relationship, and corresponding utility as a standard candle, the distance to Polaris has been highly sought-after by astronomers. It is the closest Cepheid to Earth, and thus key to calibrating the Cepheid standard candle; Cepheids form the base of the cosmic distance ladder by which to probe the cosmological nature of the universe.

Distance measurement techniques depend on whether or not components A and B are a physical pair, that is, gravitationally bound. If they are, then their estimated distance can be presumed to be equal. (Note: Their minimum spatial separation is the angular separation: 0.09 mrad (18.2 arcseconds), i.e. 0.009% of their distance from Earth; it could be higher (2x-5x) depending on the orbital eccentricity and orientation of the apsides to Earth's sightline. In any case, distance estimate uncertainties have far exceeded 0.2%, with only Gaia approaching the latter precision, when neglecting systematic uncertainties. Future Gaia data may enable solving this outer orbit, constraining the apsides and thus precisely determining the distance between the components.) Gravitational binding of this pair is well supported by observations, and the presumption of common distance is widely adopted in historical and recent estimates.

For most of the 20th century, available observation technologies remained inadequate to precisely measure absolute parallax. Instead, the main technique was to use theoretical models of stellar evolution for both main sequence and giant stars, combined with spectroscopic and photometric data to estimate distances. Such modeling relies on theoretical assumptions and guesses, and contains much systematic error and statistical uncertainties in population data. Even by 2013, these techniques were still struggling to achieve even 10% precision in either main sequence or Cepheid modeling.

Further progress was thus limited until the advent of Hipparcos, the first instrument able to engage in all-sky absolute parallax astrometry. Its first data release was in 1997.

Selected distance estimates to Polaris
Published	Component	Distance		Source	Notes
Published	Component	ly	pc	Source	Notes
1966	B	(359) (Note: The paper only estimates an absolute magnitude of roughly 3.3 with an apparent magnitude of 8.51. That implies a distance modulus of 5.21, implying a distance around 110 pc. A notional magnitude error of ±0.3 would correspond to roughly ±16 pc error.)	(110)	Fernie	Photometry and modeling of B
1977	B	(399) (Note: The paper only estimates an absolute magnitude of roughly 3.16. Taken with the quoted apparent magnitude 8.6, that implies a distance modulus of 5.44, implying a distance around 122 pc. A notional magnitude error of ±0.1 would correspond to roughly ±6 pc error. Extinction was concluded to be negligible.)	(122)	Turner	Photometry and modeling of B
1978	A	356^{*}	109^{*}	Gauthier and Fernie	Modeling extinction and Cepheid evolution of A
1996	B	359^{*}	110^{*}	Kamper	Photometry and modeling of B, reproducing prior estimates
1997	A	431±29	132±9	Hipparcos	All-sky/absolute parallax observations, of the primary variable (Note: Parallax 7.56±0.48 mas)
2004–2013	A, B	307±13	94±4	Turner/Turner et al	Cepheid evolution modeling, cluster kinematics and ZAMS fitting, photometry and modeling of B, spectral line ratios of A calibrated on yellow supergiants
2004–2013	A, B	329±10	101±3	Turner/Turner et al	Cepheid evolution modeling, cluster kinematics and ZAMS fitting, photometry and modeling of B, spectral line ratios of A calibrated on yellow supergiants
2004–2013	A, B	323±7	99±2	Turner/Turner et al	Cepheid evolution modeling, cluster kinematics and ZAMS fitting, photometry and modeling of B, spectral line ratios of A calibrated on yellow supergiants
2007 (Note: Parallax 7.54±0.11 mas; observations from 1989 to 1993, first analysis published 1997, revised analysis published 2007.)	A	432±6	133±2	Hipparcos	All-sky/absolute parallax observations, revised analysis, of the primary variable
2008	B	357^{*}	109.5^{*}	Usenko & Klochkova	Photometry and modeling of B
2014	A	>385	>118	Neilson	Cepheid evolution modeling, independent of any distance prior
2018	B	521±20	160±6	Hubble, Bond et al.	Relative parallax of the wide component referencing photometrically-calibrated background stars
2018	B	445.3±1.7	136.6±0.5	Gaia DR2	All-sky/absolute parallax observations, of the wide component (Note: Statistical distance calculated using a weak distance prior)
2020	B	446.5±1.1	136.9±0.3	Gaia DR3	All-sky/absolute parallax observations, of the wide component (Note: The raw parallax is 7.2869±0.0178 mas; applying a basic systematic correction gives 7.3045±0.0178 mas)

^{*} Estimate did not state its uncertainty

After the arrival of the Hipparcos data, the distance to Polaris and consequent analysis of its Cepheid variation was controversial. The Hipparcos distance for Polaris was broadly but not universally adopted. Immediately, the Hipparcos data for the nearest few hundred Cepheids appeared to clarify Cepheid models and to clear up then-tension in higher rungs of the distance ladder. However alternatives remained; particularly by Turner et al, who published several papers between 2004 and 2013.

Stellar parallax is the basis for the parsec, which is the distance from the Sun to an astronomical object which has a parallax angle of one arcsecond. (1 AU and 1 pc are not to scale, 1 pc = about 206265 AU)

In 2018, Bond et al. used the Hubble Space Telescope to provide an alternative direct measurement of Polaris's parallax; they summarize the back-and-forth:

However, Turner et al. (2013, hereafter TKUG13) argue that the parallax of Polaris is considerably larger, 10.10 ± 0.20 mas (d = 99±2 pc). The evidence cited by TKUG13 for this “short” distance includes (1) a photometric parallax for Polaris B based on measured photometry, spectral classification, and main-sequence fitting; (2) a claim that there is a sparse cluster of A-, F-, and G-type stars within 3° of Polaris, with proper motions and radial velocities similar to that of the Cepheid, for which the Hipparcos parallaxes combined with main-sequence fitting give a distance of 99 pc; and (3) a determination of the absolute visual magnitude of Polaris based on line ratios in high-resolution spectra, calibrated against supergiants with well-established luminosities. [...]

[...]

In a critique of the TKUG13 paper, van Leeuwen (2013, hereafter L13) defended the Hipparcos parallax by presenting details of the solution, concluding that “the Hipparcos data cannot in any way support” the large parallax advocated by TKUG13. Using Hipparcos data, L13 also questioned the reality of the sparse cluster proposed by TKUG13, presenting evidence against it both from the color versus absolute-magnitude diagram for stars within 3° of Polaris, and their non-clustered distribution of proper motions. Lastly, L13 examined the absolute magnitudes of nearly 400 stars of spectral type F3 V in the Hipparcos catalog with parallax errors of less than 10%, and showed that the absolute magnitude of Polaris B would fall well within the observed MV distribution for F3 V stars, based on either the Hipparcos parallax of A or the larger parallax proposed by TKUG13. Thus, he concluded that the photometric parallax of B does not give a useful discriminant.

— "Hubble Space Telescope Trigonometric Parallax of Polaris B, Companion of the Nearest Cepheid"

Bond et al. go on to find a trigonometric parallax (independent of Hipparcos) that implies a distance further-still than the "long" Hipparcos distance, well outside the plausible range of the "short" distance estimates.

The next major step in high precision parallax measurements comes from Gaia, a space astrometry mission launched in 2013 and intended to measure stellar parallax to within 25 microarcseconds (μas). Although it was originally planned to limit Gaia's observations to stars fainter than magnitude 5.7, tests carried out during the commissioning phase indicated that Gaia could autonomously identify stars as bright as magnitude 3. When Gaia entered regular scientific operations in July 2014, it was configured to routinely process stars in the magnitude range 3–20. Beyond that limit, special procedures are used to download raw scanning data for the remaining 230 stars brighter than magnitude 3 (including Polaris at magnitude 2); methods to reduce and analyse these data are being developed; and it is expected that there will be "complete sky coverage at the bright end" with standard errors of "a few dozen μas".

Gaia DR2 does not include a parallax for Polaris A, but a distance inferred from Polaris B (magnitude 8.7) is 136.6±0.5 pc (445.5±1.7 ly), somewhat further than most previous estimates and (in principle) considerably more accurate. There are known to be considerable systematic uncertainties in DR2.

Gaia DR3 significantly improved both the statistical and systematic uncertainties, although the latter remain numerous and on the order of 10–60 μas; the new estimate is 136.9±0.3 pc (446.5±1.1 ly) using the baseline parallax zeropoint correction.

Gaia DR4 (expected December 2026) will further improve the statistical and systematic uncertainties in general, and the data pipelines for variable and multiple stars in particular. Multistar orbital solutions will become available, greatly aiding the study of Cepheids and Polaris, and in particular, may enable solving the outer AB orbit.

== Etymology and cultural significance ==
=== The name Polaris ===
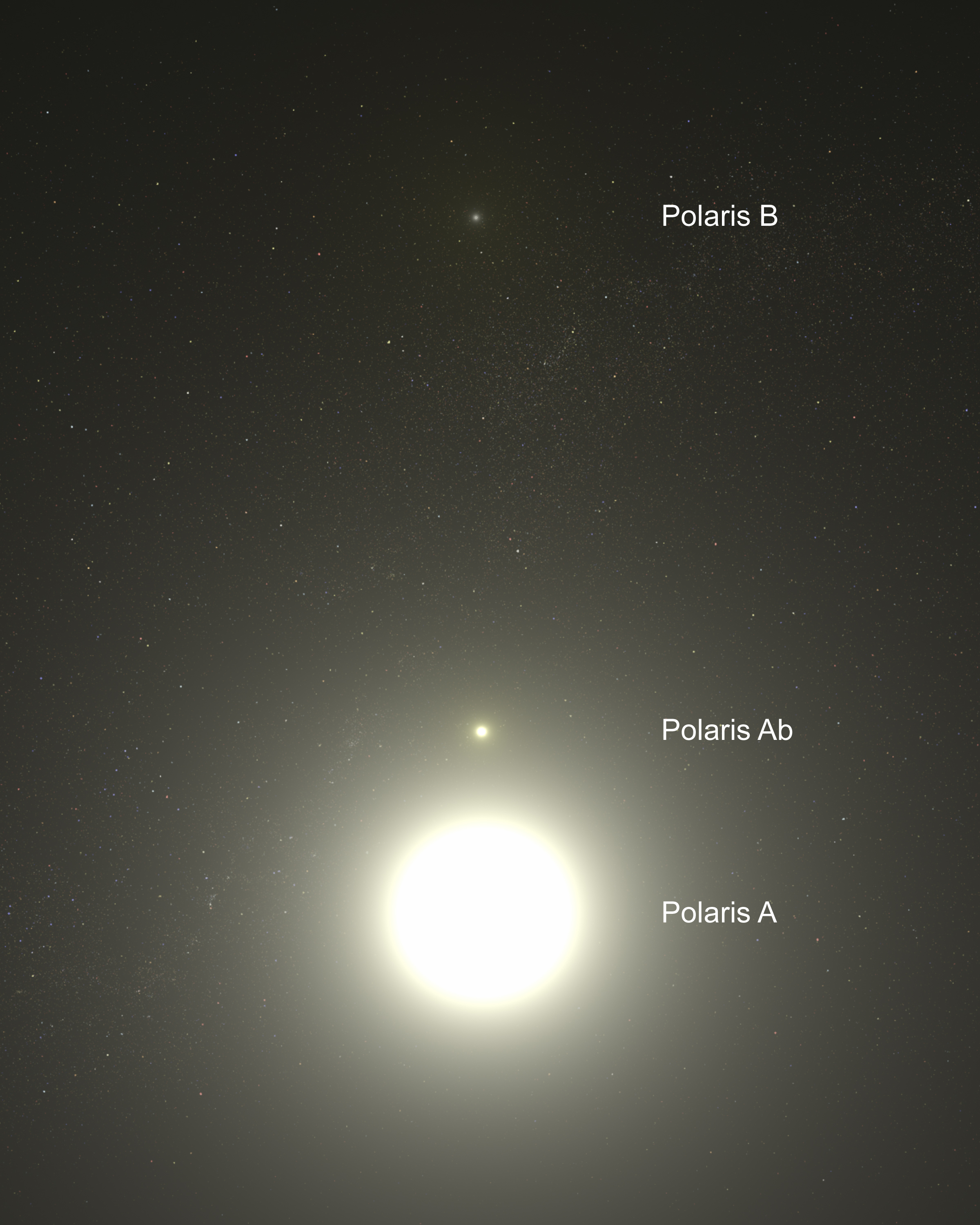
Artist's conception showing supergiant Polaris Aa, dwarf Polaris Ab, and the distant dwarf companion Polaris B

The modern name Polaris is shortened from the Neo-Latin stella polaris ("polar star"), coined in the Renaissance when the star had approached the celestial pole to within a few degrees. The first appearance of the name stella polaris in print was in the Alfonsine Tables of 1492.

Gemma Frisius, writing in 1547, referred to it as stella illa quae polaris dicitur ("that star which is called 'polar'"), placing it 3° 8' from the celestial pole.

In 2016, the International Astronomical Union organized a Working Group on Star Names (WGSN) to catalog and standardize proper names for stars. The WGSN's first bulletin of July 2016 included a table of the first two batches of names approved by the WGSN; which included Polaris for the star α Ursae Minoris Aa.

=== Europe ===
In antiquity, Polaris was not yet the closest naked-eye star to the celestial pole, and the entire constellation of Ursa Minor was used for navigation rather than any single star. Polaris moved close enough to the pole to be the closest naked-eye star, even though still at a distance of several degrees, in the early medieval period, and numerous names referring to this characteristic as polar star have been in use since the medieval period. In Old English, it was known as scip-steorra ("ship-star").

In the "Old English rune poem", the T-rune is apparently associated with "a circumpolar constellation", or the planet Mars.

In the later medieval period, it became associated with the Marian title of Stella Maris "Star of the Sea" (so in Bartholomaeus Anglicus, c. 1270s), due to an earlier transcription error.

An older English name, attested since the 14th century, is lodestar "guiding star", cognate with the Old Norse leiðarstjarna, Middle High German leitsterne.

The ancient name of the constellation Ursa Minor, Cynosura (from the Greek κυνόσουρα "the dog's tail"), became associated with the pole star in particular by the early modern period. An explicit identification of Mary as stella maris with the polar star (Stella Polaris), as well as the use of Cynosura as a name of the star, is evident in the title Cynosura seu Mariana Stella Polaris (i.e. "Cynosure, or the Marian Polar Star"), a collection of Marian poetry published by Nicolaus Lucensis (Niccolo Barsotti de Lucca) in 1655.

It was invoked as a symbol of steadfastness in poetry, as "steadfast star" by Spenser. Shakespeare's sonnet 116 is an example of the symbolism of the north star as a guiding principle: "[Love] is the star to every wandering bark / Whose worth's unknown, although his height be taken."

In the ancient Finnish worldview, the North Star has also been called taivaannapa and naulatähti ("the nailstar") because it seems to be attached to the firmament or even to act as a fastener for the sky when other stars orbit it. Since the starry sky seemed to rotate around it, the firmament is thought of as a wheel, with the star as the pivot on its axis. The names derived from it were sky pin and world pin.

=== Arab world and Asia ===
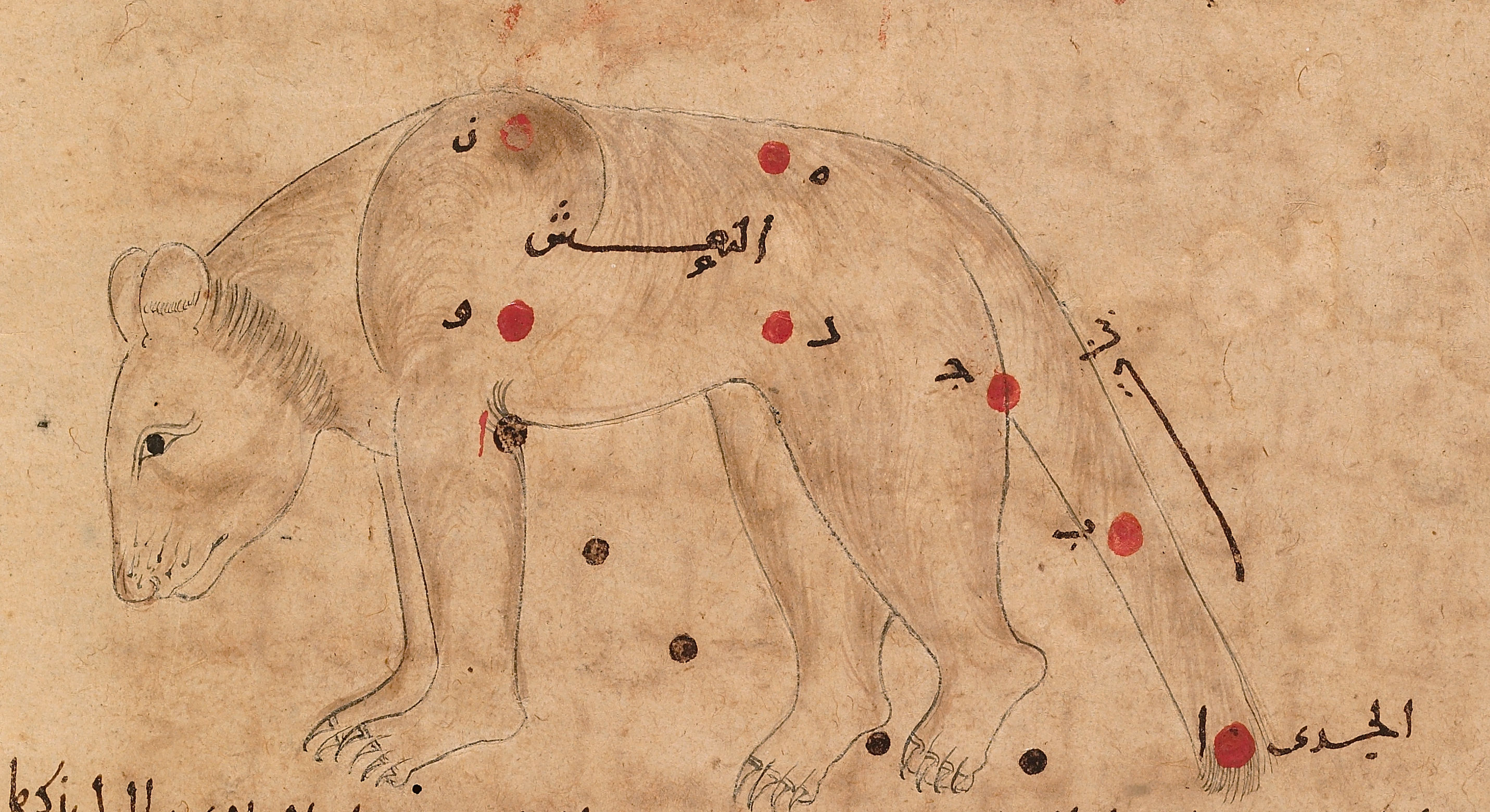
Ursa Minor as depicted in the 964 Persian work Book of Fixed Stars, Polaris named al-Jady "الجدي" in the lower right

Its name in traditional pre-Islamic Arab astronomy was al-Jady الجدي ("the kid", in the sense of a juvenile goat ["le Chevreau"] in Description des Etoiles fixes), and that name was used in medieval Islamic astronomy as well. In those times, it was not yet as close to the north celestial pole as it is now, and used to rotate around the pole.

Another name of Arabic origin, Alrucaba or Alruccabah (from al-rukba meaning knee), appears in some Western sources, starting with the Alfonsine Tables of 1492, but this was applied in error.

In the Hindu Puranas, it became personified under the name Dhruva ("immovable, fixed").

In traditional Chinese astronomy, Polaris is part of the asterism Gouchen (勾陈, "Curved Array"), along with Delta, Epsilon and Zeta Ursae Minoris, and two other stars in Cepheus.

=== North America ===
In Inuit astronomy, Polaris is known as Nuutuittuq (syllabics: ᓅᑐᐃᑦᑐᖅ).

In traditional Lakota star knowledge, Polaris is named "Wičháȟpi Owáŋžila". This translates to "The Star that Sits Still". This name comes from a Lakota story in which he married Tȟapȟúŋ Šá Wíŋ, "Red Cheeked Woman". However, she fell from the heavens, and in his grief Wičháȟpi Owáŋžila stared down from "waŋkátu" (the above land) forever.

The Plains Cree call the star in Nehiyawewin: acâhkos êkâ kâ-âhcît "the star that does not move" (syllabics: ᐊᒑᐦᑯᐢ ᐁᑳ ᑳ ᐋᐦᒌᐟ).

In Mi'kmawi'simk the star is named Tatapn.

=== Polynesia ===
A Hawaiian name for this star, used by the Polynesian Voyaging Society, is Hōkūpa‘a meaning "fixed star".

== In popular culture ==
Polaris is depicted in the flag and coat of arms of the Canadian Inuit territory of Nunavut, the flag of the U.S. states of Alaska, Maine, and Minnesota, and the flag of the U.S. city of Duluth, Minnesota.

=== Vexillology ===
Flag of Nunavut

Flag of Alaska

Flag of Minnesota

Flag of Duluth, Minnesota

Flag of Maine

Flag of Maine (1901–1909)

Flag of the Pan-American Exposition (1901)

Sledge flag used by Francis Leopold McClintock in the Arctic (1852–1854)

=== Heraldry ===
Coat of arms of Nunavut

Seal of Minnesota

Seal of Maine

Coat of arms of Utsjoki

=== Ships ===
- The Chinese spy ship Beijixing is named after Polaris.
- USS Polaris is named after Polaris

== Gallery ==
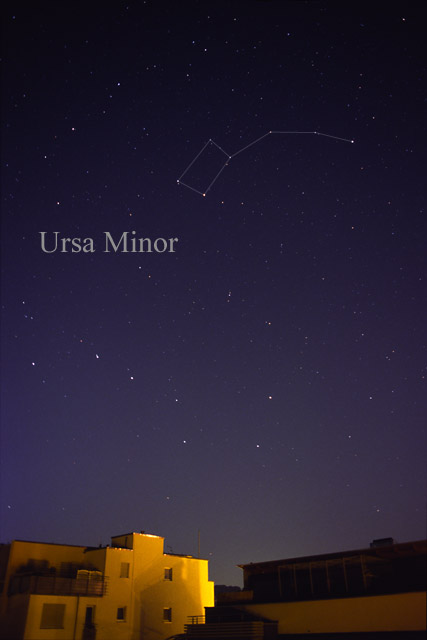
Polaris is the brightest star in the constellation of Ursa Minor (upper right).

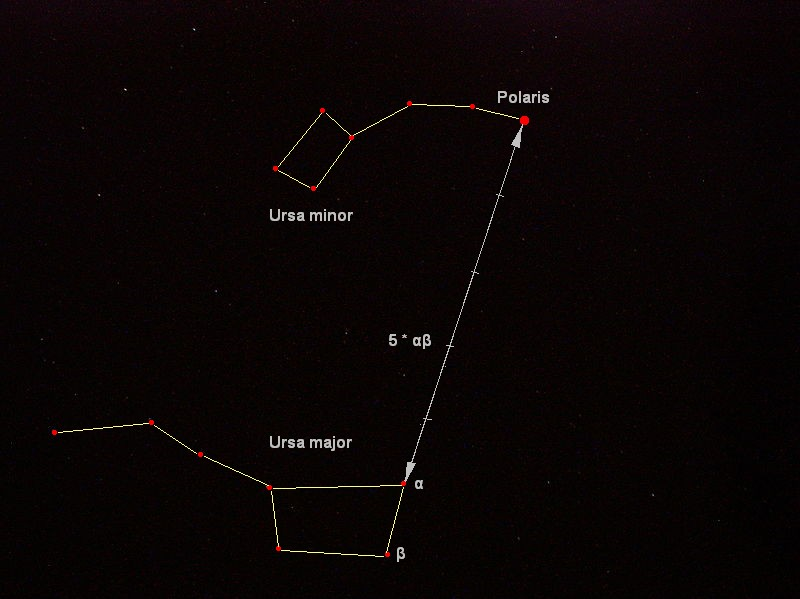
Big Dipper and Ursa Minor in relation to Polaris

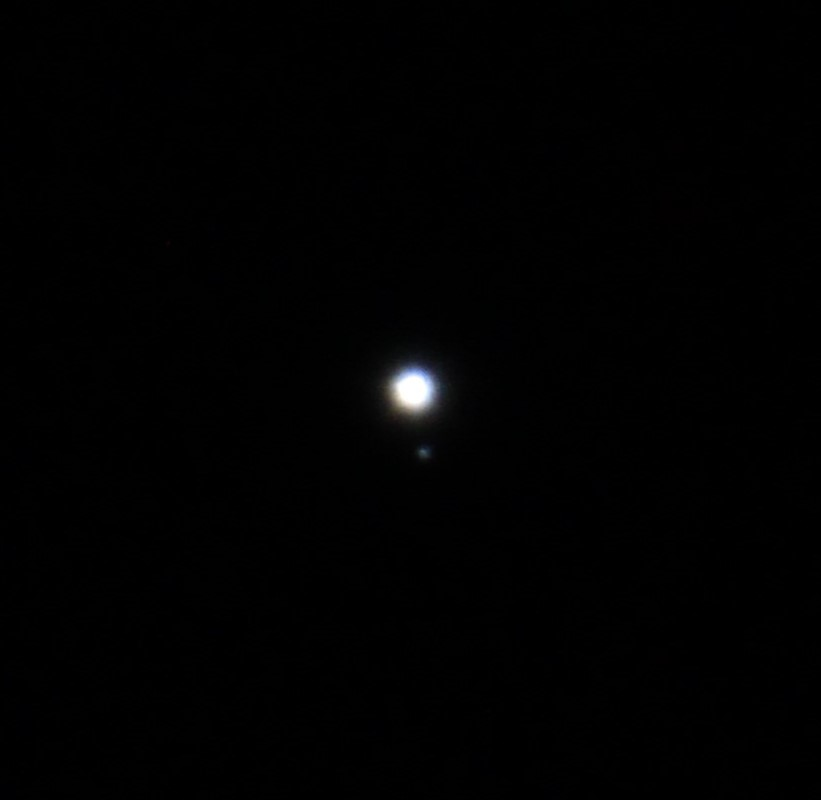
A view of Polaris in a small telescope. Polaris B is separated by 18 arc seconds from the primary star, Polaris A.

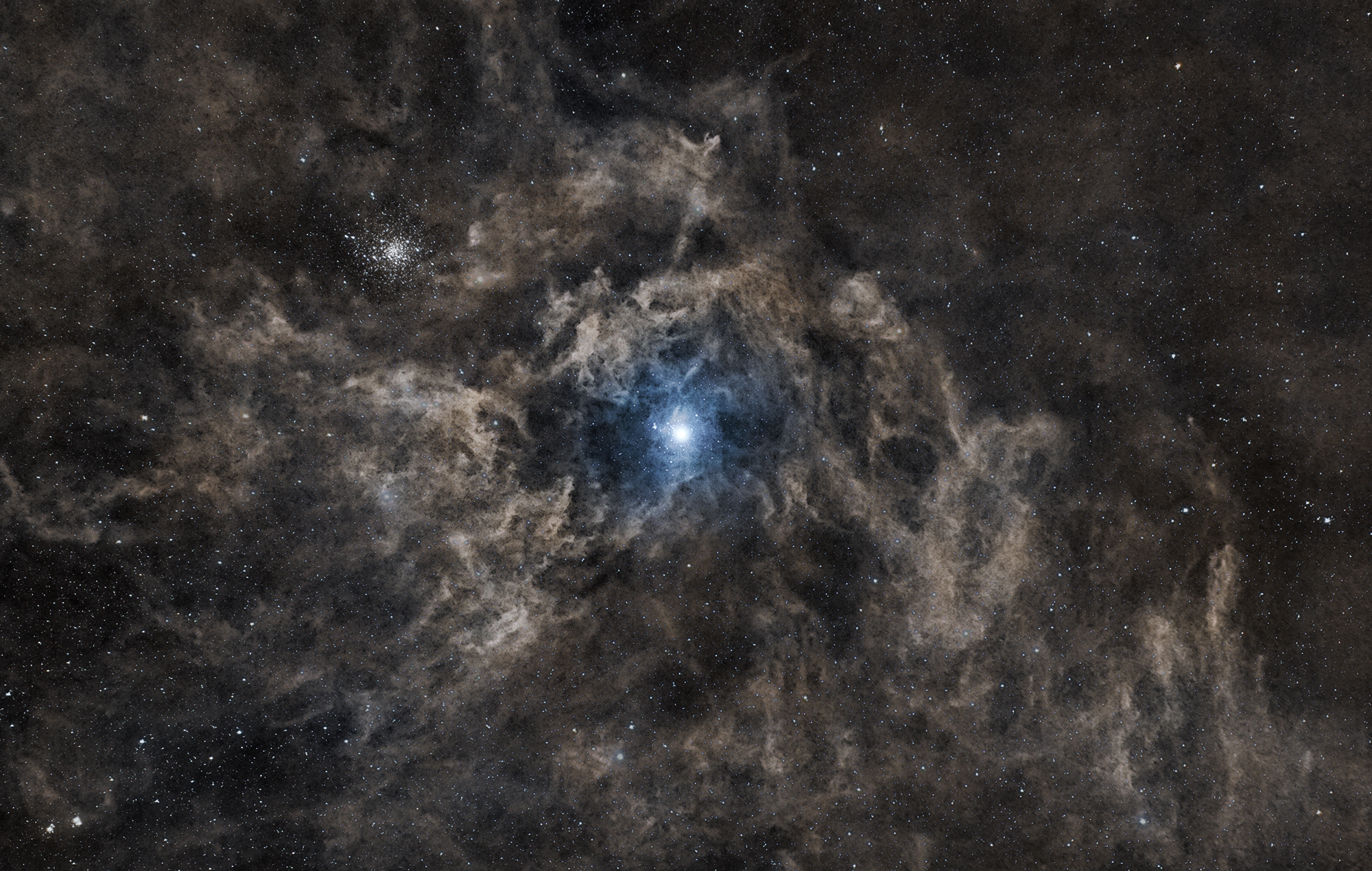
Polaris, its surrounding integrated flux nebula, and NGC188

== See also ==
- Extraterrestrial sky (for the pole stars of other celestial bodies)
- List of nearest supergiants
- Polar alignment
- Sigma Octantis
- Polaris Flare
- Regiment of the North Pole

== Notes ==
Preceded by Kochab & Pherkad	Pole star 500–3000	Succeeded by Gamma Cephei
