= Alexander Yuk Ching Ma =

Chinese-American convicted former CIA officer and FBI translator

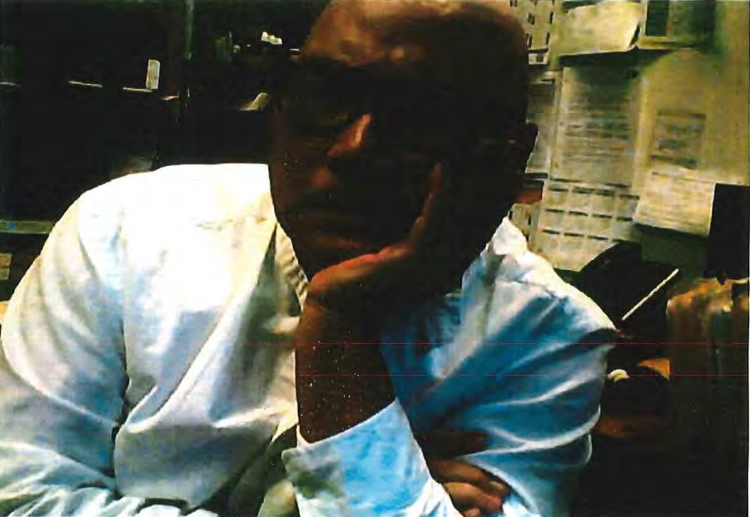
- Ma in a 2019 FBI recording, meeting with an undercover agent posing as an MSS officer
- Born: 1952 (age 73–74); British Hong Kong
- Other name: Alex
- Citizenship: United States
- Education: The Farm; University of Hawaiʻi at Mānoa
- Criminal charge: Conspiracy to transmit national defense information (18 USC § 793)
- Criminal status: Guilty, imprisoned at Federal Detention Center, Honolulu; BOP Register #12272-122
- Espionage activity
- Allegiance: United Kingdom (1952–?); United States (before 2001); China (2001–present)
- Agency: Central Intelligence Agency (1982–1989); Ministry of State Security (2001–present)

Alexander Yuk Ching Ma (Chinese: 馬玉清; born 1952) is an American former CIA clandestine officer accused of acting as a double agent on behalf of the People's Republic of China, gaining employment with the FBI in order to act as a mole. He was arrested in August 2020, charged under the Espionage Act with conspiring along with his brother, also a former CIA officer, to pass classified information to officials of the Chinese Ministry of State Security. He pled guilty and was sentenced to 10 years in prison.

== Early life and CIA career ==
Born in British Hong Kong in 1952, Ma and his older brother, David, born in nationalist Chinese Shanghai in 1936, moved to Honolulu, Hawaii in 1968 and became US citizens, attending the University of Hawaiʻi at Mānoa. Following graduation, David joined the CIA as a clandestine officer assigned to the Far East at the height of the Vietnam war.

In 1983, David Ma resigned from the CIA after an investigation found he inappropriately used his position to assist Chinese nationals obtain entry into the United States. Within the same year, then 30-year old Alex joined the agency, also as a clandestine officer. Following training at The Farm, the younger Ma was also sent to the Far East.

In 1989, Alex Ma abruptly left the agency, and around 1995 he moved to Shanghai.

== Espionage for China ==
Ma's alleged spying for China is believed to have begun in March 2001, with a three-day debriefing in a Hong Kong hotel by officers of the Shanghai State Security Bureau (SSSB), the city's aggressive subsidiary of China's Ministry of State Security (MSS). During the meeting, which was partly videotaped, Ma and his brother David are alleged to have provided information about the CIA personnel, operations, and covert communications techniques, in exchange for $50,000 in cash.

After Ma moved back to Hawaii in 2002, he sought employment with the FBI with the intent to regain access to classified information in order to provide it to the MSS. Though he applied for a position as a special agent, at age 49 he was over the age limit, instead he was hired by the FBI’s Honolulu Field Office as a linguist tasked with translating Chinese language documents. During his hiring by the FBI in 2004, he is alleged to have passed a polygraph examination which asked questions regarding foreign contacts and personal loyalties. The day before starting his new job with the FBI, Ma called a suspected accomplice to inform them he would now be working full-time for "the other side."

Over the following six years with the FBI, Ma regularly copied, photographed and stole classified documents, bringing many of them with him on frequent trips to China with the intent to provide them to his handlers. Customs declarations indicated that Ma often returned from China with thousands of dollars in cash and expensive gifts, such as a new set of golf clubs.

David Ma is believed to have continued to maintain contact with the MSS, staying in contact with Alex and MSS handlers while he embedded himself in the Chinese immigrant community in Los Angeles.

In one instance, Alex's wife Amy Ma, also born in Hong Kong, was used as a courier, flying to Shanghai and delivering an encrypted laptop computer to handlers from the SSSB.

== Investigation and arrest ==
In January 2019, Ma confirmed to an undercover FBI agent that he had in the past provided valuable U.S. government materials to the Chinese government, and that he would be willing to do so in the future. On March 13, 2019, Ma accepted $2,000 from the same undercover FBI agent, who told Ma that the money was acknowledgment for his work on behalf of China. On August 12, 2020, Ma accepted another $2,000 from the undercover FBI agent, expressed his willingness to continue to help the Chinese government, and stated that he wanted "the motherland" to succeed.

On August 14, 2020, Ma was arrested on charges of conspiracy. The Justice Department identified Ma's older brother, David, as an unindicted co-conspirator to the crimes, but deemed him unfit to stand trial due to his advanced neurological decline from an Alzheimer’s diagnosis ten years prior. In 2021, Alexander Ma claimed to be having memory problems and asked for a mental competency evaluation. In February 2023, he was deemed competent to stand trial.

== Guilty plea ==
On May 24, 2024, Ma pleaded guilty to conspiracy to commit espionage.

In September 2024, he was sentenced to 10 years in prison as part of a plea bargain.

== See also ==
- Chinese espionage in Hawaii
- List of Chinese spy cases in the United States
