= Gate-crashing (espionage) =

Chinese espionage practice in the US

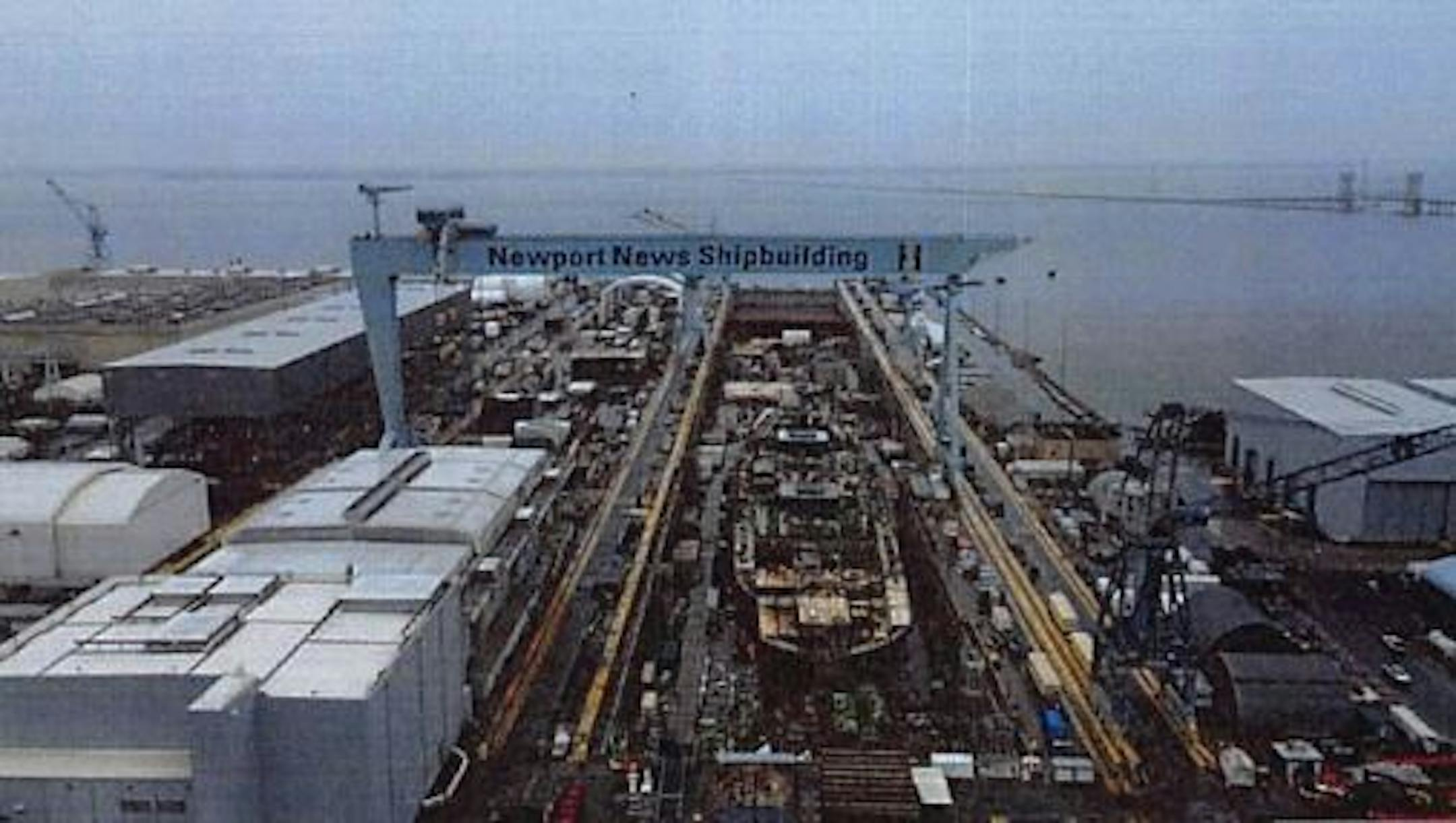
A U.S. Navy ship under construction at Newport News Shipbuilding in 2024 as viewed from a drone operated by a Chinese national.

Gate-crashing is a term used to describe the apparent Chinese government practice of pressing Chinese citizens present in the United States into service to make generally unsophisticated attempts to trespass on sensitive U.S. government facilities and areas. The U.S. government views the phenomena as a form of espionage by China intended to test security practices at sensitive installations. The trespassers are typically described as having claimed to be lost tourists.

The term is applied to several related practices: gate-crashers, who physically attempt to force their way past guards and barricades at the entrances of restricted areas like military bases; individuals who are found to have "accidentally" wandered into restricted areas like bases or test ranges from adjacent public areas; and sometimes to describe individuals who fly drones into restricted areas or surveil them with long-range cameras.

== Incidents ==
According to the FBI, the U.S. has identified more than 100 documented instances of gate-crashing, including:

- At Joint Expeditionary Base Little Creek-Fort Story, Virginia, two Chinese diplomats and their wives sped through the front gates of the Navy SEAL base and failed to stop until base officials pulled a firetruck into the road to block their path. All were expelled from the U.S. on suspicions of espionage in 2019, the first publicly known expulsion of Chinese diplomats from the U.S. since 1986. According to The New York Times, at least one of the Chinese officials was a known intelligence officer operating under diplomatic cover.
- At Joint Base Pearl Harbor-Hickam in Hawaii, Chinese nationals purportedly visiting Hawaii for just two days with no registered hotel room were caught by NCIS using drones and photography equipment to capture images of the base. The incident, which occurred in late 2023, was reportedly the 14th such attempt by Chinese nationals at the base since 2018.
- At Cape Canaveral, Florida, agents from Homeland Security Investigations (HSI) identified several Chinese nationals who were scuba diving in a murky industrial area within the secure perimeter adjacent to the facility's launch pads.
- At Naval Air Station Key West, Florida, an F-35 fighter jet training base, Chinese nationals claiming to be tourists and students have repeatedly breached the base. Some have walked around the perimeter fence from the adjacent beaches, while others have driven through the main entrance gate and ignored orders to stop. In 2020, three Chinese nationals were sentenced to prison after pleading guilty to illegal entry after failing to stop at the base entrance which resulted in a 30-minute police chase on the base. Upon arrest, several trespassers were discovered to have taken specific photos of antennas and other "vital military equipment" on the Truman Annex and Sigsbee Annex portions of the base.
- At Donald Trump's Mar-a-Lago estate in Florida, a Chinese woman was found trespassing carrying two passports, four cellphones, a hidden camera detector, large amounts of cash, and seven flash drives possibly containing malware. In 2019 she was sentenced to eight months in prison.
- At the White House, staff and Secret Service officials have reported Chinese nationals leaving the tour area to take pictures of the grounds, particularly communications gear and the positions of security guards.
- At Fort Wainright in remote Fairbanks, Alaska, several Chinese nationals claiming to be tourists attempted to physically push past gate guards, claiming they had reservations for a hotel on the base. Upon investigation, U.S. officials discovered a drone and camera equipment in the car.
- At White Sands National Park in New Mexico, a vast desert surrounded by the White Sands Missile Range, Chinese visitors have repeatedly been caught crossing from the park into the missile range with cameras.
- At Marine Corps Air Ground Combat Center Twentynine Palms in the California desert, a Chinese national attempted to drive onto the base after being turned away by military police. He was pursued onto the base by police, and upon arrest he was determined to be in the U.S. illegally.
- At Naval Station Norfolk and Newport News Shipbuilding in Virginia, a Chinese national and graduate student at the University of Minnesota, was indicted for flying drones over sensitive naval facilities including the construction of nuclear submarines. An FBI investigation determined that he had flown from Minnesota to Virginia before travelling to two different naval installations located approximately 45 minutes apart. When questioned by officials, the man abandoned the drone and quickly fled the region. He was convicted of espionage charges and served six months in prison before being deported.
- In Washington state, two Chinese nationals were arrested in July 2025 for performing surveillance of a key Navy base and several recruiting stations. Federal prosecutors said the pair were tasked by China's Ministry of State Security (MSS) and were observed making dead drops, transmitting information collected back to China, and discussing plans to spot, assess and recruit potential agents within the U.S. Navy.

== U.S. response ==
In most cases, those who have trespassed on bases, have been detained briefly by U.S. authorities, and then escorted out of the country. U.S. policymakers have acknowledged that many cases may be falling between the cracks in jurisdiction, as trespass laws are largely codified at the state and local level in the United States. Representative Jason Crow of Colorado suggested Congress might introduce legislation on the issue and expressed a desire to train state and local partner agencies as "right now, they don’t know how to deal with it."

== See also ==
- Chinese intelligence activity abroad
