= Chinese spy ship Beijixing =

Type 815 spy ship of PLA Navy

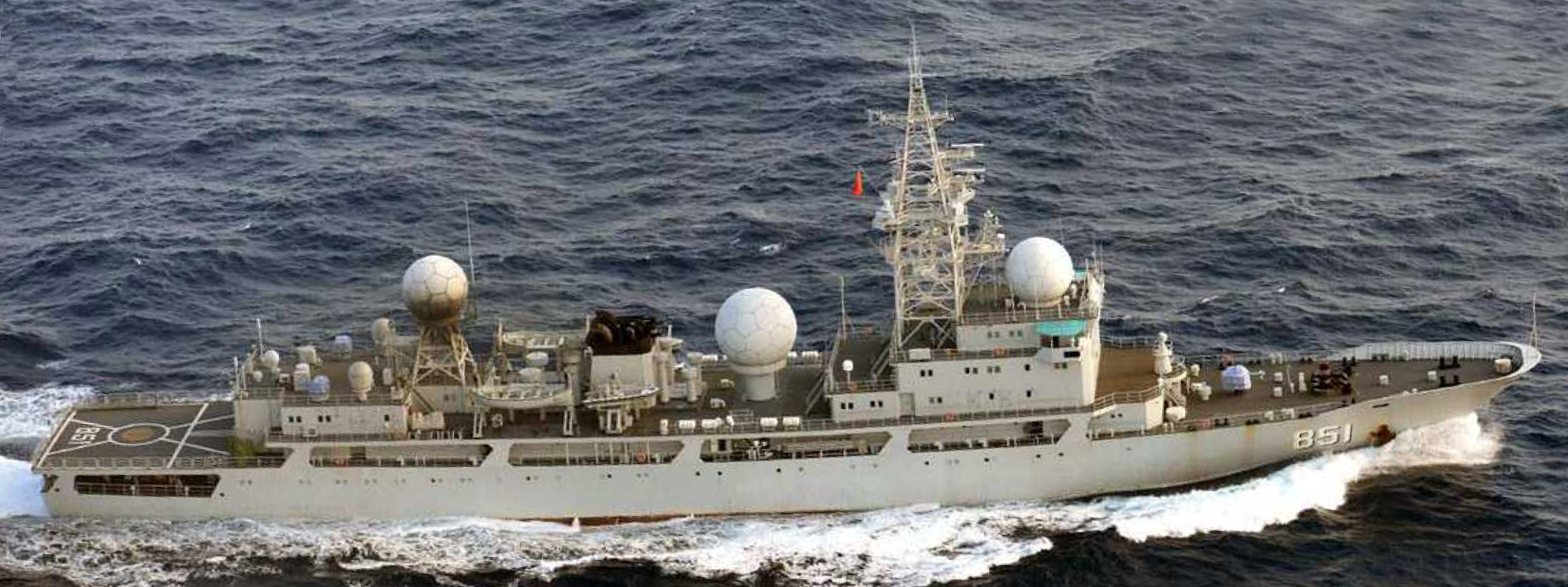
- Beijixing on 12 December 2014

History

China
- Name: Beijixing; (北极星)
- Namesake: Beijixing (Polaris)
- Builder: Hudong–Zhonghua Shipbuilding
- Commissioned: Late 1991
- Renamed: from Dongdiao (232); (东调)
- Identification: Pennant number: AGI-851
- Status: Active

General characteristics
- Class & type: Type 815 spy ship
- Displacement: 5,998 t (5,903 long tons; 6,612 short tons), light load; 5,998 t (5,903 long tons; 6,612 short tons), full load
- Length: 132.6 m (435 ft 0 in)
- Beam: 17.4 m (57 ft 1 in)
- Draft: 6.5 m (21 ft 4 in)
- Propulsion: 2 × 12PC2-5V diesel engines; Total output: 5,736 kW (7,692 hp)
- Speed: 37 knots (69 km/h; 43 mph)
- Complement: 250
- Armament: 1 × twin 37 mm gun; 2 × twin 25 mm guns
- Aviation facilities: Hangar and helipad

Beijixing (Chinese: 北极星, meaning North Star; pennant number: AGI-851) is the lead ship of the Type 815 spy ship of the People's Liberation Army Navy (PLAN). She was originally named Dongdiao (Chinese: 東調; pennant number: 232). Her main task is to monitor and analyze electronic signal intelligence. It may also conduct tactical ballistic missile tests, missile trajectory measurement and missile tracking tasks.

== Description ==
She has been modified throughout the years. After modification, the original dish antenna was replaced by three large radomes.

The long bow building is adopted, and the first building extends to the helicopter deck, which not only increases the height of the freeboard, but also increases the space inside the ship. The bow has a slight sheave, and the front section is also equipped with a fender. These measures are to reduce the waves on the deck and make the ship suitable for ocean navigation.

== Construction and career ==
Dongdiao was commissioned in late 1991 after being completed by Hudong–Zhonghua Shipyard, Shanghai. She serves under the East Sea Fleet.

In February 2000, she was first seen off the coast of Japan.

Afterwards, she was renamed Beijixing (851).

It was reported during RIMPAC 2014, she was monitoring the exercise while outside US territorial waters but in the exclusive economic zone of Hawaii.

She was again sent to monitor RIMPAC 2018.
