= Type 815 spy ship =

Chinese naval ship class

History

PRC
- Status: Active

General characteristics
- Class & type: Dongdiao I / II class
- Type: Spy ships (AGI)
- Propulsion: Marine Diesel
- Sensors & processing systems: Navigation radar
- Electronic warfare & decoys: None
- Armour: None
- Aircraft carried: 1
- Aviation facilities: Helipad

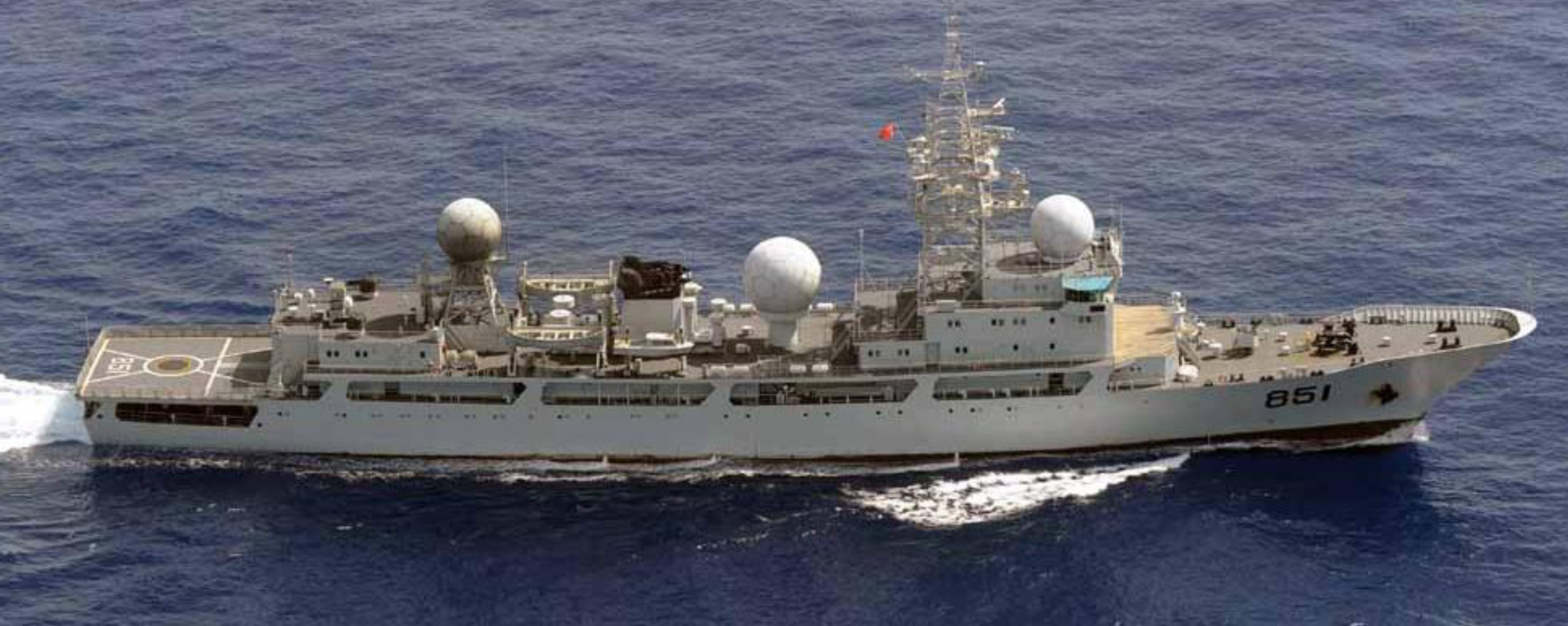
Type 815 ship Beijixing (Polaris)

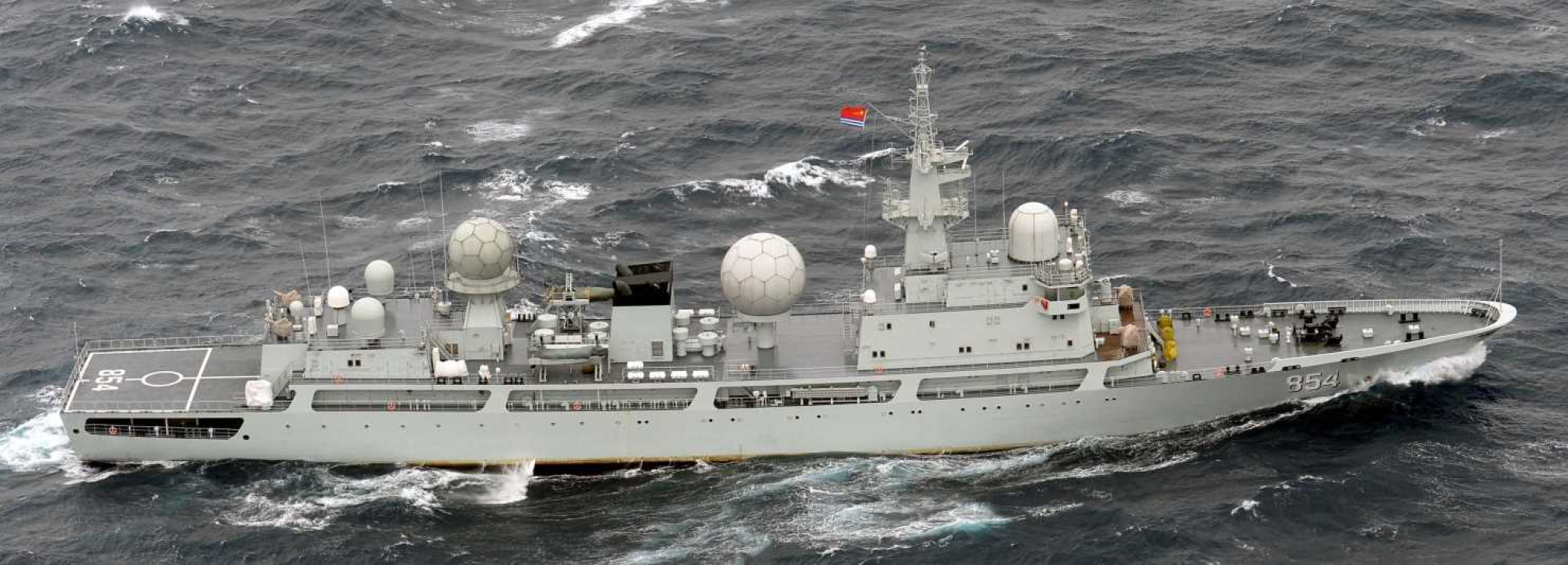
Type 815G ship Tianlangxing (Sirius)

The Type 815, as well as its derivatives Type 815G and Type 815A, are a class of Chinese electronic surveillance ships in service with the People's Liberation Army Navy (PLAN). Type 815 spy ship has received NATO reporting name Dongdiao class (meaning East Investigation), while its successors Type 815G & 815A have received NATO reporting name Dongdiao II class.

== Type 815 ==
Type 815 was designed to be a follow-on for earlier Type 813, but the latter did not immediately retire after the former has been commissioned, and both types served together until Type 813 was finally retired from PLAN and transferred to Chinese Coast Guard and converted to PRCCGS # 3469 cutter. Type 815 was formerly named as Dong-Diao (东调, meaning "East Investigate") (Pennant #232), but subsequently, the name was changed to Polaris after new naming convention adopted by PLAN. After entering service in the latter half of 1999, the ship went through a major upgrade several years later, with parabolic antennas replaced by three large radomes. In addition to collecting electronic intelligence, this class is also tasked to perform ballistic missile tracking. There is a hangar for a helicopter. Specification:

- Length: 130 m (430 ft)
- Width: 16.4 m (54 ft)
- Draft: 6.5 m (21 ft)
- Displacement: 6,000 tonnes (5,900 LT)
- Speed: 20 knots (37 km/h; 23 mph)
- Crew: 250
- Propulsion: diesel engine
- Armament: 1 Type 76 twin 37 mm naval gun, 2 Type 61 twin 25 mm AA gun

Pennant #	Name	Builder	Commissioned	Status	Fleet
AGI-791 (Ex AGI-851)	Beijixing (Polaris)	Hudong-Zhonghua Shipbuilding	late 1999	Active	East Sea Fleet

== Type 815G ==
In 2009 an improved version appeared, designated as Type 815G, and the most obvious external visual difference between Type 815G and earlier Type 815 is that the former has a different mast somewhat similar to a pagoda shape, and the sheer line is curved at a greater angle.

Pennant #	Name	Builder	Launched	Commissioned	Status	Fleet
AGI-793 (Ex AGI-853)	Tianwangxing (Uranus)	Hudong, Shanghai	1 December 2009	1 December 2010	Active	East Sea Fleet
AGI-794 (Ex AGI-854)	Tianlangxing (Sirius)	Hudong, Shanghai	29 March 2014	15 February 2015	Active	North Sea Fleet
AGI-795 (Ex AGI-855)	Tianshuxing (Dubhe)	Hudong, Shanghai	28 July 2014	1 August 2015	Active	South Sea Fleet
AGI-792 (Ex AGI-852)	Haiwangxing (Neptune)	Hudong, Shanghai	22 January 2015	26 December 2015	Active	South Sea Fleet

== Type 815A ==
In January 2017, an improved Type 815G entered service with Chinese navy. Designated as Type 815A, this further improved Type 815 can be visually distinguished from earlier Type 815G by the radome above the pilothouse: the radome of Type 815A is a cylinder with flat top surface, while the top of cylinder radome of earlier Type 815G has a semi-sphere.

Pennant #	Name	Builder	Launched	Commissioned	Status	Fleet
AGI-796 (Ex AGI-856)	Kaiyangxing (Mizar)	Hudong-Zhonghua Shipbuilding	8 June 2016	10 January 2017	Active	North Sea Fleet
AGI-797 (Ex AGI-857)	Tianguanxing (Megrez)	Hudong-Zhonghua Shipbuilding	14 February 2017	2017	Active	South Sea Fleet
AGI-798 (Ex AGI-858)	Yuhengxing (Alioth)	Hudong-Zhonghua Shipbuilding	8 September 2017	2018	Active	East Sea Fleet
AGI-799 (Ex AGI-859)	Jinxing (Venus)	Hudong-Zhonghua Shipbuilding	3 February 2018	2018	Active	North Sea Fleet

== Operations ==
The Type 815 is the most common spy ship deployed off the Taiwan Strait. Beginning in 2017, at least one Type 815G ship has been used to monitor each of the biennial Talisman Saber military exercises in northern Australia; in 2021, two such vessels, the Tianwangxing (天王星, Uranus) and Haiwangxing (海王星, Neptune) were deployed. In 2024, Tianquanxing (天權星, Megrez) was spotted off the coast of Pingtung ahead of Taiwan's missile tests.

In May 2022 the Haiwangxing conducted surveillance operations from Australia’s waters in the Northwest, coming at one point within 50 nautical miles of the Harold E Holt naval communications station in what the Australian defence minister said was “an act of aggression”

In April 2025, the Tianguanxing (AGI-797), along with the Aircraft Carrier Shandong and Type-055 Destroyer Yan’an, were deployed in response to Balikatan 2025.
