= Daqi-1 =

Earth observation satellite

- Mission type: Remote sensing
- Operator: China National Space Administration
- COSPAR ID: 2022-039A
- SATCAT no.: 52257
- Mission duration: 8 years (planned)

Spacecraft properties
- Bus: SAST-5000B
- Manufacturer: Shanghai Academy of Spaceflight Technology

Start of mission
- Launch date: 15 April 2022, 18:16 UTC
- Rocket: Long March 4C
- Launch site: Taiyuan Satellite Launch Center, Launch Complex 9, Shanxi, China
- Contractor: China Aerospace Science and Technology Corporation

Instruments
- ACDL, DPC-II, EMI-II, POSP, WSI

Daqi-1 or Atmospheric Environment Monitoring Satellite is a Chinese atmospheric environmental monitoring satellite in sun-synchronous orbit which was launched on 15 April 2022.

Its Aerosol and Carbon Detection Lidar (ACDL) instrument is thought to be the most likely cause of a green laser light observed over Hawaii on 28 January 2023 by the Subaru Telescope. Some believe the satellite was using the ACDL sensor to conduct laser topographic intelligence collection being done for military purposes.

== Spacecraft architecture ==
The spacecraft is based on the Shanghai Academy of Spaceflight Technology's SAST-5000B bus and is similar to the Gaofen 5 satellite.

The satellite was launched from the Taiyuan Satellite Launch Center's Launch Site 9, via a Long March 4C rocket.

== Sensors onboard ==
- ACDL (Aerosol and Carbon dioxide Detection Lidar)
- DPC-II (Directional Polarimetric Camera)
- EMI-II (Environmental Trace Gas Monitoring Instrument)
- POSP (Particulate Observing Scanning Polarization)
- WSI (Wide Spectral Imager)
  - The wide-swath imager (WSI) equipped on the DaQi-1 satellite uses a 45° rotary scanning mirror, a K-mirror, and several linear-array charge-coupled devices (CCDs) to collect ground images in a whiskbroom mode.
